The names of places in what is today the Czech Republic have evolved during their history. The list concerns primarily the settlements, but bilingual names for significant mountains and rivers are also listed. Places are sorted alphabetically according to their German names.

Many of the German names are now exonyms, but used to be endonyms commonly used by the local German population, who had lived in many of these places until shortly after World War II.

Until 1866, the only official language of the Austrian Empire administration was German. Some place names were merely "Germanized" versions of the original Czech names, as seen e.g. from their etymology. The compromise of 1867 marked a recognition of the need for bilingualism in areas where an important portion of the population used another language; the procedure was imposed by official instructions in 1871.

Explanatory notes
For each settlement, it is stated in which municipality it is located according to the current division. The following abbreviations are used:
(e) – extinct (indicating that the settlement no longer exists)
MTA  – military training area (belonging to one of the four military areas in the country, which are the only areas not incorporated to any municipality)
p. of – administrative part of the municipality that follows

A

Aag: Doubí, p. of Třebeň
Abaschin: Závišín, p. of Zádub-Závišín
Abdank: Adámky, now Loučovice (e)
Abertham: Abertamy
Abtsroth: Opatov, p. of Luby (Cheb District)
Abtsdorf bei Zwittau: Opatov
Adamsfreiheit: Hůrky, p. of Nová Bystřice
Adamstadt: Adamov (České Budějovice District)
Adamsthal:
Adamov (Blansko District)
Adamov, p. of Trutnov
Adamov, now Karlovice (Bruntál District) (e)
Adelsdorf: Adolfovice, p. of Bělá pod Pradědem
Adersbach: Adršpach
Adersbacher Felsen: Adršpašské skály (rock town)
Adlerdörfel: Orličky
Adlerhütte: Samoty, now Horní Vltavice (e)
Adlerkosteletz: Kostelec nad Orlicí
Admannsdorf: Adamov (Kutná Hora District)
Adolfsgrün: Adolfov, now Telnice (Ústí nad Labem District)
Ahornhütte: Javory
Ahornsäge: Javoří Pila, now Modrava (e)
Ahlkirschen: Bílá Třemešná
Ahrendorf: Pavlov, now Klášterec nad Ohří (e)
Aich: Doubí, p. of Karlovy Vary
Aichen: Horní Sukolom, p. of Uničov
Ainsersdorf: Jednov, p. of Suchdol (Prostějov District)
Albendorf: Bělá u Jevíčka
Alberitz:
Albeřice, p. of Verušičky
Malměřice, p. of Blatno (Louny District)
Albern: Albeř, p. of Nová Bystřice
Albernhof: Alberov, now Královské Poříčí (e)
Albersdorf:
Albrechtice (Karviná District)
Písařova Vesce, p. of Lesná (Tachov District)
Albersdörfer Brand: Milíře
Albrechtitz:
Albrechtice (Ústí nad Orlicí District)
Albrechtice, p. of Malešov
Albrechtsschlag: Albrechtovice, p. of Záblatí (Prachatice District)
Albrechtsdorf: Albrechtice v Jizerských horách
Alfredshof: Alfrédov, now Kostelec (Tachov District)
Algersdorf: Valkeřice
Allenkowitz: Halenkovice
Allerheiligen: Vyšehorky, p. of Líšnice (Šumperk District)
Allusch: Záluží, p. of Přídolí
Aloisdorf: Alojzov
Alschowitz: Alšovice, p. of Pěnčín (Jablonec nad Nisou District)
Altalbenreuth: Mýtina, p. of Lipová (Cheb District)
Alt Benatek: Benátky nad Jizerou II
Alt Biela: Stará Bělá, p. of Ostrava
Alt Bohmen: Stará Bohyně, p. of Malšovice
Altbrunst: Starý Brunst, now Čachrov (e)
Altbunzlau: Stará Boleslav
Altdorf: Stará Ves, now Hradiště MTA (e)
Alt Ehrenberg: Staré Křečany
Altenberg: Staré Hory, p. of Jihlava
Altenbuch: Staré Buky
Altenburg: Staré Hrady
Altendorf:
Stará Ves (Bruntál District)
Stará Ves (Přerov District)
Stará Ves, p. of Stará Ves nad Ondřejnicí
Stará Ves, p. of Vysoké nad Jizerou
Staré Oldřůvky, p. of Budišov nad Budišovkou
Altengrün: Dolní Nivy
Altenteich: Starý Rybník, p. of Skalná
Alt Erbersdorf: Staré Heřminovy
Altfürstenhütte: Stará Knížecí Huť, p. of Lesná (Tachov District)
Alt Georgswalde: Starý Jiříkov, p. of Jiříkov
Alt Grafenwalde: Staré Hraběcí, p. of Velký Šenov
Alt-Grammatin: Mutěnín
Althabendorf (Alt-Habendorf): Stráž nad Nisou
Althammer: Staré Hamry
Althart: Staré Hobzí
Alt Harzdorf: Liberec XV-Starý Harcov
Alt Hrosenkau: Starý Hrozenkov
Althütten:
Stará Huť
Stará Huť, now Ktiš (e)
Stará Huť, p. of Nemanice
Staré Hutě
Staré Hutě, p. of Horní Stropnice
Alt Hwiezdlitz: Staré Hvězdlice, p. of Hvězdlice
Altkinsberg: Starý Hrozňatov, now Cheb
Alt-Kolin: Starý Kolín
Altleipa: Stará Lípa, p. of Česká Lípa
Altliebe: Stará Libavá, p. of Norberčany
Alt Moletein: Starý Maletín, p. of Maletín
Alt Oderberg: Starý Bohumín, p. of Bohumín
Alt Ohlisch: Stará Oleška, p. of Huntířov
Altpaka: Stará Paka
Alt Parisau: Starý Pařezov, p. of Pařezov
Alt Paulsdorf: Liberec XII-Staré Pavlovice
Alt Petrein: Starý Petřín
Altpocher: Stoupa, now Lesná (Tachov District) (e)
Alt Prachatitz: Staré Prachatice, p. of Prachatice
Alt Prennet: Starý Spálenec, p. of Česká Kubice
Alt Raunek: Starý Rounek, now Vyskytná nad Jihlavou
Alt Raußnitz: Rousínovec, p. of Rousínov
Alt Reisch: Stará Říše
Alt Rognitz: Starý Rokytník, p. of Trutnov
Alt Rohlau: Stará Role, p. of Karlovy Vary
Alt Rothwasser: Stará Červená Voda
Altsattel:
Staré Sedlo, p. of Orlík nad Vltavou
Staré Sedlo (Tachov District)
Altsattl:
Staré Sedlo (Sokolov District)
Staré Sedlo, p. of Teplá
Alt Schallersdorf: Starý Šaldorf, now Znojmo (e)
Alt Schokau: Starý Šachov
Alt Sedlowitz: Starý Sedloňov, now Velké Svatoňovice
Altspitzenberg: Starý Špičák, now Boletice MTA (e)
Altstadt:
Stará Ves, p. of Bílovec
Děčín III-Staré Město
Staré Město (Bruntál District)
Staré Město (Frýdek-Místek District)
Staré Město (Svitavy District)
Staré Město, p. of Karviná
Staré Město, p. of Náchod
Staré Město, p. of Třinec
Staré Město pod Landštejnem
Altstadt bei Ungarisch Hradisch: Staré Město (Uherské Hradiště District)
Alt Steindorf: Starý Hubenov, now Hubenov
Alt Tabor: Sezimovo Ústí
Alt Thein (Altthein): Starý Týn, p. of Úštěk
Alttitschein (Alt Titschein): Starý Jičín
Alt Traubendorf: Starý Hrozenkov
Alt Turkowitz: Staré Dobrkovice, p. of Kájov
Altvatergebirge: Hrubý Jeseník (mountain range)
Altvater: Praděd (mountain)
Alt Vogelseifen: Stará Rudná, p. of Rudná pod Pradědem
Altwasser:
Stará Voda (Cheb District)
Stará Voda, p. of Světlá Hora
Alt Wiklantitz: Staré Vyklantice, p. of Vyklantice
Alt Zechsdorf: Staré Těchanovice
Alt Zedlisch: Staré Sedliště
Amalienfeld: Amalín, p. of Slezské Rudoltice
Amonsgrün: Úbočí, p. of Dolní Žandov
Amplatz: Oplotec, p. of Horšovský Týn
Amschelberg: Kosova Hora
Andersdorf:
Ondrášov, p. of Moravský Beroun
Ondřejov, p. of Rýmařov
Andreasberg: Ondřejov, now Boletice MTA (e)
Andreasdorf: Ondřejov (Pelhřimov District)
Angel: Úhlava (river)
Angern: Bujanov
Anischau: Úněšov
Annadorf:
Anenská Ves, p. of Krajková
Annín, p. of Tovačov
Annathal: Annín, p. of Dlouhá Ves (Klatovy District)
Antiegelhof: Antýgl, now Srní
Antoniendorf: Cihelna, p. of Hlavňovice
Antonienhöhe: Antonínova Výšina, p. of Vojtanov
Antonienthal: Antonínův Důl, p. of Jihlava
Antoniwald: Antonínov, p. of Josefův Důl (Jablonec nad Nisou District)
Antoschowitz: Antošovice, p. of Ostrava
Arbesau: Varvažov, p. of Telnice (Ústí nad Labem District)
Archlebau: Archlebov
Arletzgrün: Arnoldov, p. of Ostrov (Karlovy Vary District)
Arnau: Hostinné
Arnitzgrün (Arnetzgrün): Arnoltov, p. of Březová (Sokolov District)
Arnsdorf: Arnoltice
Arnoltice, p. of Bulovka
Arnultovice, p. of Jindřichov (Bruntál District)
Arnultovice, p. of Nový Bor
Arnultovice, p. of Rudník (Trutnov District)
Arnultovice, p. of Velké Chvojno
Artholz: Artolec, p. of Nová Bystřice
Asch: Aš
Aschendorf: Okřešice, p. of Česká Lípa
Aspendorf: Osikov, p. of Bratrušov
Atschau: Úhošťany, p. of Kadaň
Attes: Zátes, now Přídolí (e)
Au: Loužek, p. of Cheb
Aubeln: Úblo, p. of Brumovice (Opava District)
Aubotschen (Aubotsch): Úboč
Audechen: Zálužice, p. of Hartmanice (Klatovy District)
Audishorn: Útěchovice, p. of Hamr na Jezeře
Aue: Luhy, p. of Horní Benešov
Auern: Návary, p. of Staré Město pod Landštejnem
Augezd:
Újezd (Olomouc District)
Újezd (Zlín District)
Újezd, p. of Mohelnice
Augiesel: Újezd, p. of Trmice
Auherschitz:
Uhřice (Kroměříž District)
Uhřice (Hodonín District)
Auhertschitz: Úherčice
Auhertz: Úherce (Louny District)
Aujezd ob der Mies: Újezd nade Mží
Aujest bei Hochfeld: Újezd (Zlín District)
Aujestel: Újezdec, p. of Bolešiny
Aujestetz:
Újezdec (Prachatice District)
Újezdec (Jindřichův Hradec District)
Aumonin: Úmonín
Auperschin: Úpořiny, p. of Bystřany
Auporsch: Úpoř, p. of Světec
Auras: Úraz, p. of Nemyšl
Auretz: Úherce (Louny District)
Aurim: Uhřínov, p. of Liberk
Aurinowes (Aurschinewes): Prague 22-Uhříněves
Auscha: Úštěk
Auschitz: Úžice (Mělník District)
Auschowitz: Úšovice, p. of Mariánské Lázně
Auspitz: Hustopeče
Aussee: Úsov
Außergefild: Kvilda
Aussig: Ústí nad Labem
Austerlitz: Slavkov u Brna
Autieschau: Útěšov, p. of Bavorov
Autschin: Ujčín, p. of Kolinec
Autschowa: Ohučov, p. of Staňkov (Domažlice District)
Auwal: Úvaly

B

Babe (Baby): Babí, p. of Náchod
Babilon: Babylon (Domažlice District)
Babina I: Babiny I, p. of Malečov
Babina II: Babiny II, p. of Homole u Panny
Babtschitz: Babčice, p. of Vodice (Tábor District)
Bachelsdorf: Děčín XXVI-Bechlejovice
Backofen an der Iser: Bakov nad Jizerou
Bad Bielohrad: Lázně Bělohrad
Bad Johannisbrunn: Jánské Koupele, p. of Staré Těchanovice
Bad Karlsbrunn: Karlova Studánka
Bad Königswart: Lázně Kynžvart
Bad Liebwerda: Lázně Libverda
Bad Lindewiese: Lipová-lázně
Bad Neudorf: Konstantinovy Lázně
Bad Schlag: Jablonecké Paseky, p. of Jablonec nad Nisou
Bad Sternberg: Lázně Šternberk, now Ledce (Kladno District)
Bad Wurzelsdorf: Kořenov
Badstübel: Podštěly, p. of Chyše
Bäckenhain: Pekařka, p. of Bílý Kostel nad Nisou
Baislowitz: Zbyslavice
Bärn: Moravský Beroun
Barnsdorf: Bernartice nad Odrou
Bärnsdorf an der Tafelfichte: Horní Řasnice
Bärnwald: Neratov v Orlických horách, now Bartošovice v Orlických horách
Bärringen: Pernink
Bakow an der Iser: Bakov nad Jizerou
Balklhota: Balkova Lhota
Banow: Bánov (Uherské Hradiště District)
Banowitz: Báňovice
Barau: Bavorov
Barchowitz: Barchovice
Barking: Borek, p. of Malšovice
Bartelsdorf:
Bartoňov, p. of Ruda nad Moravou
Bartovice, p. of Ostrava
Bartultovice, p. of Vysoká (Bruntál District)
Dřínov, now Most (e)
Barzdorf:
Bernartice (Jeseník District)
Božanov
(am Rollberge): Pertoltice pod Ralskem
Basberg: Hora Svatého Šebastiána
Baschka: Baška (Frýdek-Místek District)
Baschten: Holubovská Bašta, p. of Čakov (České Budějovice District)
Batschetin: Bačetín
Battelau: Batelov
Batzdorf:
Bartošovice v Orlických horách
Bartultovice, p. of Vysoká (Bruntál District)
Bauschenhof: Pouchov, p. of Hradec Králové
Bauschowitz (an der Eger): Bohušovice nad Ohří
Bausnitz: Bohuslavice, p. of Trutnov
Bautsch: Budišov nad Budišovkou
Bayerhof: Bajerov
Bechin (Beching): Bechyně
Becwar: Bečváry
Bedihoscht: Bedihošť
Bejscht (Beyscht): Býšť
Benatek: Benátky nad Jizerou
Beneschau:
Benešov
Benešovice
Dolní Benešov
Benetschlag: Bláto, now Boletice MTA (e)
Benhof: Beňovy, p. of Klatovy
Benke: Benkov, p. of Dlouhomilov
Benkowitz: Benkovice, p. of Hradec nad Moravicí
Bennisch: Horní Benešov
Bensen: Benešov nad Ploučnicí
Beraun: Beroun
Berg:
Hora Svatého Václava
Horka, p. of Nový Kostel
Bergau: Bergov, p. of Vlčice (Jeseník District)
Bergersdorf: Kamenná (Jihlava District)
Bergesgrün: Chudeřín, p. of Litvínov
Berggraben: Vrchová, now Bernartice (Trutnov District)
Berghäuseln: Hůrky, p. of Karlovy Vary
Bergjanowitz: Vrchotovy Janovice
Bergles: Bražec
Bergreichenstein: Kašperské Hory
Bergstadt: Horní Město
Bergstadt Platten: Horní Blatná
Bergstadtl:
Hory Matky Boží, p. of Velhartice
Ratibořské Hory
Berlau: Brloh (Český Krumlov District)
Bernarditz: Bernartice (Písek District)
Bernau:
Bernov, p. of Krajková
Bernov, p. of Nejdek
Berneck: Pernek, p. of Horní Planá
Bernetzreith: Pernolec, p. of Částkov (Tachov District)
Bernhau: Barnov, now Libavá MTA (e)
Bernklau: Bezvěrov
Bernschlag:
Podlesí, p. of Staré Město pod Landštejnem
Nový Vojířov, p. of Nová Bystřice
Bernsdorf: Bernartice (Trutnov District)
Berzdorf:
Liberec XX-Ostašov
Pertoltice (Liberec District)
Besdiedowitz (Besdietowitz): Bezdědovice
Besdiekau (Bezdiekau):
Bezděkov (Klatovy District)
Bezděkov pod Třemšínem
Beseditz (Besseditz): Besedice, p. of Koberovy
Besikau: Bezděkov, p. of Toužim
Beskiden: Beskydy (mountain range)
Bessenitz: Besednice
Bestwin: Běstvina
Bettlern: Žebrák (Beroun District)
Bezdiek:
Bezděkov, p. of Žatec
Bezděkov u Úsova, p. of Úsov
Biberswald: Bobrovníky, p. of Hlučín
Biberteich: Bobrovník, p. of Lipová-lázně
Biebersdorf: Příbram, p. of Verneřice
Biechowitz: Prague-Běchovice
Biechtschin (Biechzin): Běštín
Biela:
Bělá (Havlíčkův Brod District)
Bělá (Pelhřimov District)
Česká Bělá
Děčín X-Bělá
Rohovládova Bělá
Bielau:
Bělá (Opava District)
Bílov (Nový Jičín District)
Bielenz: Bílence
Bieletsch: Běleč (Kladno District)
Bieloschitz: Bělušice (Most District)
Bieltsch:
Běleč (Brno-Country District)
Běleč (Tábor District)
Běleč, p. of Těšovice (Prachatice District)
Bieltscher Öd: Bělečská Lhota, p. of Těšovice (Prachatice District)
Bieltschitz: Bělčice
Bienendorf: Včelná
Bierbruck (Bierbrücke): Můstek, now Záblatí (Prachatice District) (e)
Bierloch: Brloh, p. of Louny
Bieschin (Beschin): Běšiny
Bieschtin: Běštín
Bilin: Bílina
Bilkau: Bílkov, p. of Dačice
Billowitz (Bilowitz):
Bílovice
Velké Bílovice
Binaberg: Vinná, p. of Křemže
Binowe: Byňov, p. of Homole u Panny
Binsdorf: Bynovec
Birgstein: Liberec IV-Perštýn
Birkau: Březí, p. of Čachrov
Birkenberg: Březové Hory, p. of Příbram
Birkenhaid: Březová Lada, p. of Horní Vltavice (e)
Birkigt: Děčín XXVII-Březiny
Birnai: Brná, p. of Ústí nad Labem
Birnbaumhof: Hruškové Dvory, p. of Jihlava
Birndorf: Hrušková, p. of Sokolov
Bischitz: Byšice
Bischofteinitz: Horšovský Týn
Bisenz: Bzenec
Biskupitz: Biskupice (Prostějov District)
Bisterz: Brno-Bystrc
Bistrau: Bystré (Svitavy District)
Bistritz an der Angel: Bystřice nad Úhlavou, p. of Nýrsko
Bistritz am Hostein: Bystřice pod Hostýnem
Bistritz bei Beneschau: Bystřice (Benešov District)
Bistritz ob Pernstein: Bystřice nad Pernštejnem
Bistrzitz: Bystřice (Frýdek-Místek District)
Bitouchow: Bítouchov
Bittau: Bítov (Nový Jičín District)
Bladensdorf: Mladoňov, p. of Nový Malín
Blankersdorf: Blankartice, p. of Heřmanov (Děčín District)
Blanz: Blansko
Blaschdorf: Lhotka, p. of Bílovec
Blaschin: Blažim (Plzeň-North District)
Blaschkau: Blažkov
Blaschke: Vlaské, p. of Malá Morava
Blatna: Blatná
Blatnitz (Blattnitz): Blatnice (Třebíč District)
Blattendorf: Blahutovice, p. of Jeseník nad Odrou
Blauda: Bludov (Šumperk District)
Blauendorf: Bludovice, p. of Nový Jičín
Blauenschlag: Blažejov
Bleich: Bělidla, p. of Olomouc
Bleistadt: Oloví
Bleiswedel: Blíževedly
Blisowa: Blížejov
Blosdorf: Mladějov na Moravě
Blottendorf: Polevsko
Blowitz: Blovice
Bludau: Bludov (Kutná Hora District)
Blumenau:
Květná
Květná, now Boletice MTA (e)
Plumlov
Blumendorf: Květnov, p. of Havlíčkův Brod
Bobow: Bobov, p. of Malá Skála
Bobrau: Bobrová
Bobrownik: Bobrovníky, p. of Hlučín
Bochdalau: Bohdalov
Bochdalitz: Bohdalice, p. of Bohdalice-Pavlovice
Bockhütte: Pokovy Hutě, now Nové Hutě
Bodenbach: Děčín IV-Podmokly
Bodenstadt: Potštát
Bodisch: Bohdašín, p. of Teplice nad Metují
Bohauschkowitz: Bohouškovice, p. of Křemže
Böhmdorf:
Byňov, p. of Nové Hrady (České Budějovice District)
Dolní Brzotice, now Boletice MTA (e)
Böhmen: Čechy
Böhmerwald: Šumava (mountain range)
Böhmisch Aicha: Český Dub
Böhmisch Bela: Česká Bělá
Böhmisch Bernschlag: Nový Vojířov, p. of Nová Bystřice
Böhmisch Bokau: Český Bukov, now Povrly
Böhmisch Borau: Beranov, p. of Teplá
Böhmisch Brod: Český Brod
Böhmisch Domaschlag: Domaslav, p. of Lestkov (Tachov District)
Böhmischdorf:
Česká Ves
Česká Ves, p. of Jablonné v Podještědí
Böhmisch Einsiedel: Mníšek, p. of Nová Ves v Horách
Böhmisch Gilowitz: Horní Jílovice, now Rožmberk nad Vltavou
Böhmisch Grillowitz: České Křídlovice, now Božice
Böhmisch Haidl: Maňávka, now Horní Planá (e)
Böhmisch Hammer:
České Hamry, p. of Strážov (Klatovy District)
České Hamry, p. of Vejprty
Böhmischhäuser: České Chalupy, p. of Nová Ves (Český Krumlov District)
Böhmisch Hörschlag: Český Heršlák, p. of Horní Dvořiště
Böhmisch Kahn: Velké Chvojno
Böhmisch Kamnitz: Česká Kamenice
Böhmisch Killmes: Český Chloumek, p. of Útvina
Böhmisch Kopist: České Kopisty, p. of Terezín
Böhmisch Krumau: Český Krumlov
Böhmisch Kubitzen: Česká Kubice
Böhmisch Leipa: Česká Lípa
Böhmisch Lichwe: České Libchavy
Böhmisch Liebau: Dolní Libina, p. of Libina
Bömisch Lotschnau: Český Lačnov, p. of Opatovec
Böhmisch Märzdorf: Bohdíkov
Böhmisch Matha: Dědová
Böhmisch Meseritsch: České Meziříčí
Böhmisch Müglitz: Mohelnice, now Krupka (e)
Böhmisch Neudörfel: Český Újezd, p. of Chlumec (Ústí nad Labem District)
Böhmisch Neustadtl: Dolní Bělá
Böhmisch Pokau: Český Bukov, now Povrly
Böhmisch Röhren: České Žleby, p. of Stožec
Böhmisch Rudoletz: Český Rudolec
Böhmisch Rust: Kadaňský Rohozec, p. of Radonice (Chomutov District)
Böhmisch Rybna: Česká Rybná
Böhmisch Skalitz: Česká Skalice
Böhmisch Sternberg: Český Šternberk
Böhmisch Trübau: Česká Třebová
Böhmisch Ullersdorf: Oldřichov na Hranicích, p. of Hrádek nad Nisou
Böhmisch Weigsdorf: Višňová (Liberec District)
Böhmisch Wiesen: Česká Dlouhá, now Březová nad Svitavou
Böhmisch Wiesenthal: Loučná pod Klínovcem
Böhmisch Zlatnik (Böhmisch Schladnig): České Zlatníky, p. of Obrnice
Bohutschowitz: Bohučovice, p. of Hradec nad Moravicí
Boidensdorf: Bohdanovice, p. of Jakartovice
Boksgrün: Srní, p. of Stráž nad Ohří
Bölten: Bělotín
Bössig: Bezděz (mountain)
Bogumin: Bohumín
Bohaunowitz (Bohounowitz):
Bohouňovice I, p. of Červené Pečky
Bohouňovice II, p. of Horní Kruty
Bohdalowitz: Bohdalovice, p. of Velké Hamry
Bohdanetsch:
Bohdaneč
Lázně Bohdaneč
Bohentsch: Vahaneč, p. of Verušičky
Bohnau: Banín
Bohuslawitz:
Bohuslavice (Náchod District)
Bohuslavice (Šumperk District)
Bohuslavice u Zlína
Bohutin: Bohutín (Šumperk District)
Bojkowitz (Boikowitz): Bojkovice
Bolatitz: Bolatice
Bolehoscht: Bolehošť
Bolehradice: Boleradice
Boniowitz: Bohuňovice (Olomouc District)
Boor: Bor, p. of Velešín
Bordowitz: Bordovice
Boreschnitz: Borečnice, p. of Čížová
Boreslau: Bořislav
Boritz: Bořice (Chrudim District)
Borken: Borek, p. of Dačice
Borotin:
Borotín (Blansko District)
Borotín (Tábor District)
Borotitz: Borotice (Příbram District)
Borowa: Borová (Svitavy District)
Borowitz: Borovnice (Rychnov nad Kněžnou District)
Borownitz: Borovnice (Žďár nad Sázavou District)
Borry: Bory (Žďár nad Sázavou District)
Borschanowitz: Bořanovice, p. of Vimperk
Borschau: Boršov
Borschim: Bořejov, p. of Ždírec (Česká Lípa District)
Bösching: Bezděčín, p. of Frýdštejn
Boschowitz: Bošovice
Bosenitz: Tvarožná (Brno-Country District)
Bosin: Boseň
Boskowitz: Boskovice
Boskuwek: Moravské Prusy, p. of Prusy-Boškůvky
Bosowitz: Pozovice, p. of Štoky
Botenwald: Butovice, p. of Studénka
Bowitz: Babice (Prachatice District) 
Bozegow (Boschejow): Božejov
Bradlenz: Bradlo, p. of Velký Beranov
Brand
(Brand I): Milíře
Milíře, p. of Rozvadov
Paseka, now Deštné v Orlických horách
(Brand II): Žďár, p. of Chodský Újezd
Žďár, p. of Tanvald
Brand an der Adler: Žďár nad Orlicí
Brand an der Mettau: Žďár nad Metují
Brandau: Brandov
Brandeis an der Adler: Brandýs nad Orlicí
Brandeis an der Elbe: Brandýs nad Labem
Brandeisl (Brandeisek): Brandýsek
Brandschau: Branišov
Brandzeif: Ždárský Potok, p. of Stará Ves (Bruntál District)
Branek: Branky
Branik: Prague-Braník
Branischau: Branišov, p. of Toužim
Branitschau (Branitschkow): Braníčkov, p. of Velhartice
Brankowitz: Brankovice
Branowitz: Vranovice (Brno-Country District)
Branschau:
Branišov, p. of Kdyně
Branišov, p. of Zdíkov
Bransdorf: Brantice
Brany (Bran): Braňany
Bratelsbrunn: Březí (Břeclav District)
Bratschikow (Bratrikow): Bratříkov, p. of Pěnčín (Jablonec nad Nisou District)
Bratschitz bei Tschaslau: Bratčice (Kutná Hora District)
Brättersdorf: Bratříkovice
Brattersdorf: Bratrušov
Braunau: Broumov
Braunöhlhütten: Vranová Lhota
Braunbusch (Braunpusch): Prapořiště, p. of Kdyně
Braunsberg: Brušperk
Braunsdorf: Brumovice (Opava District)
Braunseifen: Ryžoviště
Brawin: Bravinné, p. of Bílovec
Breitenau: Široká Niva
Breitenbach: Potůčky
Breitenfurt: Široký Brod, p. of Mikulovice (Jeseník District)
Brenn: Brenná, p. of Zákupy
Brenndorf: Spálená, p. of Nový Kostel
Brennei (Brana): Horní Branná
Brennporitschen: Spálené Poříčí
Brenntenberg: Spálenec, p. of Zbytiny
Bresetz: Březce, p. of Štěpánov
Bresnitz: Březnice (Příbram District)
Brettern: Desky, p. of Malonty
Bretterschlag:
Ostrov u Macochy
Petřejov, now Vyšší Brod (e)
Brettmühl: Pila, now Potůčky (e)
Brezno: Březno (Mladá Boleslav District)
Bries (Brezy):
Březí (Prague-East District)
Březí, p. of Dražíč
Briesau: Březová (Opava District)
Briesen: Břežánky, now Bílina (e)
Brims: Brniště
Brockersdorf: Čabová, p. of Moravský Beroun
Brod: Vráto
Brodek: Brodek u Konice
Broden: Bradné, p. of Čachrov
Brodetz: Brodce
Brösau: Březová (Sokolov District)
Brosdorf: Bravantice
Brozan (Brosan):
Brozany, p. of Staré Hradiště
Brozany nad Ohří
Bruch: Lom (Most District)
Bruck am Hammer: Brod nad Tichou
Bruneswerde: Stará Ves nad Ondřejnicí
Brünn: Brno
Brünnersteig: Brlenka, now Čistá (Svitavy District)
Brünnl: Dobrá Voda, p. of Horní Stropnice
Brünnles (Brünles): Brníčko
Brünnlitz: Brněnec
Brüsau: Březová nad Svitavou
Brüx: Most
Brumow: Brumov
Brunn:
Studenec, p. of Nicov
Studnice, p. of Lodhéřov
Brunnersdorf: Prunéřov, p. of Kadaň
Brzeznik: Březník
Brzezolup: Březolupy
Brzuchotein: Břuchotín, p. of Křelov-Břuchotín
Brzas (Bschas): Břasy
Bubentsch (Bubenc): Prague-Bubeneč
Bubna: Bubny, now Prague-Holešovice
Bucharten: Stará Pohůrka, p. of Srubec
Buchau: Bochov
Buchberg: Bukovec
Buchbergsthal: Železná, p. of Vrbno pod Pradědem
Buchelsdorf
Bukovice, p. of Jeseník
Bukovice, p. of Velké Losiny
Buchen:
Buk (Prachatice District)
Buk (Přerov District)
Buchers: Pohoří na Šumavě, p. of Pohorská Ves
Buchholz: Pohorsko, p. of Nezdice na Šumavě
Buchlowitz: Buchlovice
Buchsdorf: Buková, p. of Bernartice (Jeseník District)
Buchwald: Bučina, p. of Kvilda
Buchwaldsdorf: Bučnice, now Teplice nad Metují
Buda: Budov, p. of Verušičky
Budaschitz: Bohdašice, p. of Dlouhá Ves (Klatovy District)
Budigsdorf: Krasíkov
Budin (an der Eger): Budyně nad Ohří
Budischau: Budišov
Budischkowitz: Budíškovice
Budischowitz: Budišovice
Budkau: Budkov (Třebíč District)
Budnian: Budňany, now Karlštejn (Beroun District)
Budweis (Böhmisch-Budweis): České Budějovice
Budwitz: Moravské Budějovice
Buggaus: Bukovsko, p. of Malonty
Bühlöding (Büleding): Bíletín, p. of Tachov
Bukau:
(Bukow, Buck): Bukov (Žďár nad Sázavou District)
Bukov, p. of Třešť
Bünauburg: Děčín IX-Bynov
Bürgleins am Wlarapass: Hrádek na Vlárské dráze, p. of Slavičín
Bürgles: Hrádek (Hradec Králové District)
Bürgstein: Sloup v Čechách
Bukawitz: Bukovice (Náchod District)
Bukowitz:
Bukovice (Brno-Country District)
Bukovice, p. of Bžany (Teplice District)
Bukovice, p. of Písařov
Bukowka: Bukovka
Bukwa (Buckwa): Bukovany (Sokolov District)
Bullendorf: Bulovka
Bunzendorf: Boleslav, p. of Černousy
Burgstadtl: Hradec, p. of Rokle
Burgstall: Hradiště, p. of Nová Bystřice
Burgwiese: Burkvíz, p. of Město Albrechtice
Burkersdorf: Střítež, p. of Trutnov
Busau: Bouzov
Buschin: Bušín
Buschtiehrad: Buštěhrad
Buschullersdorf: Oldřichov v Hájích
Busk: Boubská, p. of Vimperk
Buslawitz: Bohuslavice (Opava District)
Butsch: Budeč (Jindřichův Hradec District)
Butschafka: Bučávka, p. of Liptaň
Butschin: Velká Bučina, p. of Velvary
Butschina: Bučina (Ústí nad Orlicí District)
Butschowitz: Bučovice
Butzkow: Buštěhrad
Bystrey: Bystré (Rychnov nad Kněžnou District)
Bzi: Bzí, p. of Dolní Bukovsko

C

Cachrau (Czachrau): Čachrov
Cakowitz: Prague-Čakovice
Caslau (Caßlau): Čáslav
Castolowitz: Častolovice
Cechtitz (Czechtitz): Čechtice
Celakowitz: Čelákovice
Cellechowitz: Čelechovice
Cerekwitz:
Cerekvice nad Bystřicí
Cerekvice nad Loučnou
Cerhenitz: Cerhenice
Cerhof: Crhov, p. of Štíty
Cernahora (Czernahora): Černá Hora (Blansko District)
Cernositz: Černošice
Cernowitz: Černovice (Blansko District)
Cestin: Čestín
Cestitz: Čestice (Strakonice District)
Chabitschau: Chabičov, p. of Háj ve Slezsku
Chanowitz: Chanovice
Charlottendorf: Karlín, now Gruna
Charlottenfeld: Karlín (Hodonín District)
Charwath: Charváty
Chawwytetz: Charvatce
Chaustnik: Choustník
Cheynow: Chýnov
Chiesch: Chyše
Chinitz-Tettau: Vchynice-Tetov, p. of Srní
Chirles: Krchleby (Šumperk District)
Chlistow: Chlístov, p. of Železný Brod
Chliwitz: Chlívce, p. of Stárkov
Chlodow: Chloudov, p. of Koberovy
Chlumcan (Klumtschan): Chlumčany (Plzeň-South District)
Chlumetschek: Chlumeček, p. of Křemže
Chlumetz:
Chlum u Třeboně
(an der Cidlina): Chlumec nad Cidlinou
Vysoký Chlumec
Chlumtschan (Klumtschan): Chlumčany (Louny District)
Chlunz: Chlumec, p. of Dačice
Chmelna:
Chmelná
Chmelná, p. of Křemže
Chodau: Chodov (Sokolov District)
Chodenschloß: Trhanov
Chodolitz: Chodovlice
Choltitz: Choltice
Chorin: Choryně
Chotieborsch (Chotebor, Choteborz): Chotěboř
Chotieschau:
Chotěšov (Litoměřice District)
Chotěšov (Plzeň-South District)
Chotimiersch: Chotiměř, p. of Blížejov
Chotowin: Chotoviny
Chotsche: Chodeč, p. of Velešín
Chotusitz: Chotusice
Chotzen: Choceň
Chräntschowitz: Chrančovice, p. of Všeruby (Plzeň-North District)
Chrast: Chrast
Chraschtian: Chrášťany (České Budějovice District)
Chrisdorf: Křišťanovice
Chrises: Křižanov, p. of Hynčina
Christelschlag: Křišťanovice, p. of Záblatí (Prachatice District)
Christianberg: Křišťanov
Christianstadt: Liberec V-Kristiánov
Christiansthal: Kristiánov, now Bedřichov (Jablonec nad Nisou District)
Christofsgrund: Kryštofovo Údolí
Christophhammer: Kryštofovy Hamry
Chrobold: Chroboly
Chropin: Chropyně
Chrostau Ölhütten: Chrastová Lhota, p. of Brněnec
Chroustowitz: Chroustovice
Chrudim: Chrudim
Chudenitz: Chudenice
Chuderitz: Chudeřice
Chudiwa: Chudenín
Chumau: Chlumany, now Boletice MTA (e)
Chumen: Chlumany
Chumo: Chlum, p. of Hartmanice (Klatovy District)
Chunzen: Chlumec (Český Krumlov District)
Chwalkowitz:
Chvalíkovice
Chvalkovice (Náchod District)
Chválkovice, p. of Olomouc
Chwalenitz: Chvalenice
Chwaletitz (Chwalletitz): Chvaletice
Chwalschowitz: Chvalšovice, p. of Čachrov
Chwojno: Vysoké Chvojno
Cimelitz (Czimelitz): Čimelice
Cirkwitz: Církvice (Kolín District)
Cischkau: Čížkov (Plzeň-South District)
Cistowes: Čistěves
Cizowa: Čížová
Ckin: Čkyně
Cyrillhof: Cyrilov, p. of Bory (Žďár nad Sázavou District)
Czabischau: Čavisov
Czalositz: Žalhostice
Czarlowitz: Černovice (Plzeň-South District)
Czaslau: Čáslav
Czastrow: Častrov
Czech: Čechy pod Kosířem
Czeikowitz: Čejkovice (Hodonín District)
Czelakowitz: Čelákovice
Czerhowitz: Cerhovice
Czetkowitz: Cetkovice
Czischkow: Čížkov (Pelhřimov District)

D

Dachau: Dachov, p. of Vlachovo Březí
Daleschitz: Dalešice (Jablonec nad Nisou District)
Dalleken: Daleké Popelice, p. of Benešov nad Černou
Dallwitz: Dalovice (Karlovy Vary District)
Damadrau: Domoradovice, p. of Hradec nad Moravicí
Damasko: Damašek, p. of Třemešná
Damborschitz (Damboritz): Dambořice
Damirow: Damírov, p. of Zbýšov (Kutná Hora District)
Damitz:
Damice, p. of Krásný Les (Karlovy Vary District)
Damnice
Damnau: Damnov, p. of Bor (Tachov District)
Darkau: Darkov, p. of Karviná
Darmschlag: Darmyšl, p. of Staré Sedlo (Tachov District)
Darowa: Darová, p. of Břasy
Daschitz: Dašice
Daßnitz: Dasnice
Datschitz: Dačice
Daub: Dub, p. of Starý Jičín
Dauba: Dubá
Daubitz: Doubice
Daubrawitz: Doubravice nad Svitavou
Daubrawnik: Doubravník
Daudleb: Doudleby nad Orlicí
Dawle: Davle
Deblin: Deblín
Dechant Gallein: Děkanské Skaliny, p. of Benešov nad Černou
Dechtar: Dehtáře
Dechtern: Dehtáře, p. of Žabovřesky (České Budějovice District)
Deffernik: Debrník, p. of Železná Ruda
Dehenten: Dehetná, p. of Stráž (Tachov District)
Dekau: Děkov
Deslawen (Deslaven): Zdeslav, p. of Čistá (Rakovník District)
Depoldowitz: Děpoltice, p. of Dešenice
Dereisen: Zderaz (Chrudim District)
Derflik: Víska u Jevíčka
Deschau: Dešov
Deschenitz: Dešenice
Deschna: Deštná (Blansko District)
Deschney: Deštné v Orlických horách
Dessendorf: Desná (Jablonec nad Nisou District)
Detenitz (Diettenitz): Dětenice
Deutsch Beneschau: Benešov nad Černou
Deutsch Bernschlag: Podlesí, p. of Staré Město pod Landštejnem
Deutsch Bielau: Bělá nad Svitavou
Deutsch Borau: Beranovka, p. of Teplá
Deutsch-Brod (Deutschbrod): Havlíčkův Brod
Deutsch Brodek: Brodek u Konice
Deutschbundesort: Dolní Rozmyšl, now Vintířov (e)
Deutsch Eisenberg: Ruda, p. of Tvrdkov
Deutsch Gabel: Jablonné v Podještědí
Deutsch Gießhübel: Vyskytná nad Jihlavou
Deutsch Gilowitz: Dolní Jílovice, p. of Vyšší Brod
Deutsch Haidl: Maňava, now Horní Planá
Deutsch Hause: Huzová
Deutsch Horschowitz: Hořovičky
Deutsch Jassnik: Jeseník nad Odrou
Deutsch Kahn: Luční Chvojno, p. of Velké Chvojno
Deutsch Kamnitz: Kamenice, p. of Zákupy
Deutsch Kilmes: Německý Chloumek, p. of Bochov
Deutsch Konitz: Miroslavské Knínice
Deutsch Kopist: Nové Kopisty, p. of Terezín
Deutsch Kralup: Kralupy u Chomutova, now Málkov (Chomutov District) (e)
Deutsch Krawarn: Kravaře
Deutsch Kubitzen: Nová Kubice, p. of Česká Kubice
Deutsch Leuten: Dolní Lutyně
Deutsch Liebau: Libina
Deutsch Lodenitz: Horní Loděnice
Deutsch Märzdorf: Horní Bohdíkov, now Velké Losiny
Deutsch Matha: Česká Metuje
Deutsch Moliken: Malíkov nad Nežárkou, p. of Horní Pěna
Deutsch Neudörfel: Podhoří, p. of Ústí nad Labem
Deutsch Neustadtl: Nové Městečko, p. of Dlouhá Ves (Klatovy District)
Deutsch Neuhof: Nové Dvory, p. of Polná
Deutsch Pankraz: Jítrava, p. of Rynoltice
Deutsch Paulowitz: Slezské Pavlovice
Deutsch Petersdorf: Petrovičky, p. of Mladkov
Deutsch Prausnitz: Německá Brusnice, now Hajnice
Deutsch Reichenau:
Rychnov u Nových Hradů, p. of Horní Stropnice
Rychnůvek, now Přední Výtoň (e)
Deutsch Rust: Podbořanský Rohozec
Deutsch Schützendorf: Střelecká, now Dobronín
Deutsch Thomaschlag: Domaslavičky, now Chodová Planá (e)
Deutsch Trebetitsch: Nové Třebčice, p. of Veliká Ves (Chomutov District)
Deutsch Welhotta: Lhota pod Pannou, p. of Homole u Panny
Deutsch Wernersdorf: Vernéřovice
Deutsch Zlatnik: Slatinice
Deutzendorf: Domaslavice, p. of Háj u Duchcova
Deyschina (Deischina): Dýšina
Dianaberg: Diana, p. of Rozvadov
Dieditz: Dědice, p. of Vyškov
Dielhau: Děhylov
Dietschan: Děčany
Dimokur: Dymokury
Dingkowitz: Jeníkovice, p. of Meclov
Dirna: Dírná
Distlowitz: Tisovka, now Boletice MTA (e)
Ditmannsdorf (Dittmarsdorf): Dětmarovice
Dittersbach:
Dětřichov (Liberec District)
Horní Dobrouč, p. of Dolní Dobrouč
Jetřichov
Jetřichovice
Stašov (Svitavy District)
Dittersbächel: Detřichovec, p. of Jindřichovice pod Smrkem
Dittersdorf:
Dětřichov (Svitavy District)
Dětřichov nad Bystřicí
Dětřichov u Moravské Třebové
Dětřichov, p. of Světlá Hora
Dětřichov, p. of Uničov
Větřkovice
Dittershof: Dětřichov, p. of Jeseník
Dittmarsdorf (Dittmannsdorf): Dětmarovice
Diwischau: Divišov
Diwischowitz: Divišovice, p. of Dešenice
Dlasckowitz: Dlažkovice
Dluhe:
Dlouhá, p. of Netřebice (Český Krumlov District)
Dlouhý, p. of Slavíkov
Dnespek: Nespeky
Döba: Děvín
Döberle: Debrné, now Trutnov (e)
Dobern:
Dobranov, p. of Česká Lípa
Dobrná
Döberney: Debrné, p. of Mostek (Trutnov District)
Doberschisch: Dobříš
Dobeschitz: Dobešice, p. of Kluky (Písek District)
Doberseik: Dobřečov, p. of Horní Město
Dobertschitz: Dobrčice
Dobichau: Dobechov, p. of Kaplice
Dobischwald: Dobešov, p. of Odry
Dobraken: Doubravka, p. of Bělá nad Radbuzou
Dobrassen: Dobroše, p. of Odrava
Dobrau: Dobrá (Frýdek-Místek District)
Dobrawod: Dobrá Voda, p. of Toužim
Dobremielitz: Dobřemilice, p. of Čachrov
Dobrenitz: Dobřenice
Dobrenz: Dobronín
Dobrey: Dobré
Dobrichowitz: Dobřichovice
Dobring: Dobřín, now Loučovice (e)
Dobrisch (Dobrzisch): Dobříš
Dobritschan: Dobříčany, p. of Liběšice (Louny District)
Dobriw: Dobřív
Dobrkowitz: Dobrkovice
Dobrochau: Dobrochov
Dobromielitz (Dobromillitz): Dobromilice
Dobroslawitz: Dobroslavice
Dobroten: Dobrotín, p. of Staré Město pod Landštejnem
Dobrowa: Doubrava, p. of Puclice
Dobrowitz (Dobrawitz): Dobrovice
Dobrusch: Dobročkov, p. of Ktiš
Dobruschka: Dobruška
Dobschan: Dobřany (Rychnov nad Kněžnou District)
Dobschikau: Dobříkov, p. of Kdyně
Dobschitz:
Dobrčice, p. of Skršín
Dobšice (České Budějovice District)
Dobrzan: Dobřany (Plzeň-South District)
Doglasgrün: Vřesová
Dohle: Dalov, p. of Šternberk
Dolan:
Dolany (Klatovy District)
Dolany (Náchod District)
Dolanken: Dolánky, p. of Ohníč
Dölitschen: Telice, p. of Prostiboř
Doll: Důl
Dollan: Dolany (Plzeň-North District)
Dollein (Dolein): Dolany (Olomouc District)
Dollern: Dolany, now Kájov
Döllnitz: Odolenovice, p. of Krásné Údolí
Dolniemtsch: Dolní Němčí
Domamühl: Domamil
Domanin: Domanín (Jindřichův Hradec District)
Domaschin: Domašín, p. of Štědrá
Domaschow: Domašov
Domauschitz: Domoušice
Domazlitzl: Domažličky, p. of Bolešiny
Dombrau: Doubrava (Karviná District)
Domousnitz: Domousnice
Domsdorf: Tomíkovice, p. of Žulová
Domstadtl: Domašov nad Bystřicí
Donau: Hájek, p. of Všeruby (Domažlice District)
Donawitz: Stanovice (Karlovy Vary District)
Dönis: Donín, p. of Hrádek nad Nisou
Doppitz: Dobětice, now Ústí nad Labem
Dörfel:
Liberec XXV-Vesec
Víska, p. of Višňová (Liberec District)
Dörfles:
Vesce, p. of Horní Stropnice
Víska u Jevíčka
Dörflitz: Derflice, p. of Znojmo
Dorf Stankau: Staňkov II, p. of Staňkov (Domažlice District)
Dorfteschen: Deštné, p. of Jakartovice
Dornfeld: Trnové Pole
Dörnsdorf: Dolina, now Kryštofovy Hamry (e)
Dörnthal: Suchdol, p. of Křimov
Dörrengrund: Suchý Důl
Dorrstadt: Městiště, p. of Dešenice
Dörrstein: Suchý Kámen, p. of Chudenín
Döschen: Dešná (Jindřichův Hradec District)
Dotterwies: Tatrovice
Doubrawitz: Doubravice, p. of Moravičany
Doudlewetz: Doudlevce, p. of Plzeň
Doxan: Doksany
Dozitz (Doschitz): Dožice, p. of Mladý Smolivec
Drachkau: Drahkov
Drahan: Drahany
Drahanowitz: Drahanovice
Drahenitz: Drahenice
Drahenz: Drahonice
Drahomischl: Drahomyšl, p. of Lipno (Louny District)
Drahotusch: Hranice IV-Drahotuše
Drahowitz: Drahovice, p. of Karlovy Vary
Drakowa: Drahkov, p. of Modlany
Draschitz (Drazitz): Dražice (Tábor District)
Draschkow: Dražkov, p. of Sezemice
Drasow (Drassow): Drásov (Brno-Country District)
Drazenov: Draženov
Dreiborn: Studnice, now Jívka
Dreibuchen: Buková, now Mohelnice
Dreihacken: Tři Sekery
Dreihäuser: Třídomí, now Horní Slavkov (e)
Dreihöf:
Oldřichovice, p. of Ústí nad Orlicí
Záhoří, p. of Žatec
Dreihöfen: Tři Dvory
Dreihunken: Drahůnky, p. of Dubí
Dresnitz: Strážnice
Drewohostitz: Dřevohostice
Dries: Dřísy
Drissgloben: Třískolupy, p. of Přimda
Drnowitz: Drnovice (Vyškov District)
Drohau (Drauhau): Drouhavec, p. of Velhartice
Drosau: Strážov (Klatovy District)
Droschdein: Droždín, p. of Olomouc
Drosenau: Drozdov (Šumperk District)
Droslau: Tvrdoslav, p. of Velhartice
Drschke: Držkov
Drzitsch (Dritsch): Dříteč
Drum: Stvolínky
Druzetz: Družec
Drzkow (Drschkow, Drschke): Držkov
Dub:
Dub (Prachatice District)
(an der March): Dub nad Moravou
Dubany: Dubany
Dubcan: Dubčany
Duben: Dubné
Dubenetz: Dubenec (Trutnov District)
Dubiken: Dubičné
Dubitz: Dubice, p. of Řehlovice
Dubitzko: Dubicko
Dublowitz: Dublovice
Dubnian: Dubňany
Dubrowitz: Dubovice
Dubschan (Dubczan): Dubčany
Dukowan: Dukovany
Dumrowitz: Domoradice, p. of Český Krumlov
Dunkelthal: Temný Důl, p. of Horní Maršov
Duppau: Doupov, now Hradiště MTA (e)
Dürchel: Drchlava, p. of Chlum (Česká Lípa District)
Dürnbach: Potočiště, p. of Odrava
Dürnberg: Suchá, p. of Jáchymov
Dürnholz: Drnholec
Dürre: Suchá
Dürrengrün: Výspa, now Luby (Cheb District) (e)
Dürrmaul: Drmoul
Dürrseifen: Suchá Rudná, p. of Světlá Hora
Duschnik: Trhové Dušníky
Duschowitz: Tuškov, p. of Kašperské Hory
Dux: Duchcov
Dworetz: Dvorec, p. of Radhostice

E

Ebenau: Zátoňské Dvory, p. of Větřní
Ebersdorf:
Habartice (Liberec District)
Habartice, now Krupka
Habartice, p. of Jindřichov (Šumperk District)
Hybrálec
Ebmeth: Rovná (Sokolov District)
Eckersbach: Rokytnice, now Kryštofovo Údolí
Eckersdorf: Jakartovice
Edersdorf: Edrovice, p. of Rýmařov
Edersgrün: Odeř, p. of Hroznětín
Eger:
Cheb
Ohře (river)
Egersee: Vyhlídky, p. of Horní Stropnice
Eggetschlag: Bližná, p. of Černá v Pošumaví
Egrisch Reuth: Nebesa, p. of Aš
Ehrenberg: Loučka, p. of Nový Jičín
Eibenberg:
Tisová, p. of Kraslice
Tisová, p. of Nejdek
Eibenschütz (Eibenschitz): Ivančice
Eibis: Ivaň (Brno-Country District)
Eichelhäuser: Dubí, now Lenora (Prachatice District)
Eichen: Dubí, p. of Kladno
Eichenhof: Dubina, p. of Šemnice
Eichhorn Bittitschka (Bititschka): Veverská Bítýška
Eichicht: Liberec XXIII-Doubí
Eicht: Dubičná, p. of Úštěk
Eichwald: Dubí
Eidlitz: Údlice
Eiland: Ostrov, now Tisá
Eilowitz: Jílovec, p. of Fulnek
Einoth: Renoty, p. of Uničov
Einsiedel: Mnichov, p. of Vrbno pod Pradědem
Einsiedel in Isergebirge: Mníšek
Einsiedl:
Mnichov (Cheb District)
Mníšek, p. of Nová Ves v Horách
Poustevna, now Rožmberk nad Vltavou (e)
Eipel: Úpice
Eisenberg:
Jezeří, p. of Horní Jiřetín (e)
Ruda (Žďár nad Sázavou District)
(an der March): Ruda nad Moravou
Eisenbrod: Železný Brod
Eisendorf: Železná, p. of Bělá nad Radbuzou
Eisengrub: Záhliní, now Hořice na Šumavě (e)
Eisenhüttel: Záchlumí (Tachov District)
Eisenstadtel (Eisenstadtl): Železnice
Eisenstein: Železná Ruda
Eisenstraß: Hojsova Stráž, p. of Železná Ruda
Eisgrub: Lednice
Eiwan: Ivaň (Prostějov District)
Eiwanowitz in der Hanna: Ivanovice na Hané
Elbe: Labe (river)
Elbekosteletz: Kostelec nad Labem
Elbeteinitz: Týnec nad Labem
Elbleiten: Labská Stráň
Elbogen:
Loket
Milbohov, p. of Stebno
Elend: Nemrlov, now Oskava
Elendbachel: Polka, p. of Horní Vltavice (e)
Eleonorenhain: Lenora (Prachatice District)
Elexnitz: Olešnice (České Budějovice District)
Elhenitz: Lhenice
Elhotten:
Lhota, p. of Bor (Tachov District)
(bei Mies): Lhota u Stříbra, p. of Stříbro
Elisenthal: Alžbětín, p. of Železná Ruda
Elisienthal: Oslí Mlýneček, now Nový Kramolín
Ellgoth:
Lhota, p. of Háj ve Slezsku
(Ellguth): Lhotka, p. of Ostrava
Ellhoten: Lhota, p. of Plzeň
Ellischau: Nalžovy, p. of Nalžovské Hory
Elm: Stráň, p. of Sadov
Elsch: Olešná, p. of Stráž (Tachov District)
Elschelin: Lšelín, p. of Kostelec (Tachov District)
Elstin (Elschtin):
Lštění, p. of Blížejov
Lštění, p. of Radhostice
Emaus: Emauzy, p. of Vražné
Emern (Emmern): Bednáře, now Černá v Pošumaví
Endersdorf: Ondřejovice, p. of Zlaté Hory
Endersgrün: Ondřejov
Engelhaus (Engelsberg): Andělská Hora (Karlovy Vary District)
Engelsberg: Andělská Hora (Bruntál District)
Engelsdorf: Andělka, p. of Višňová (Liberec District)
Engelsthal: Andělské Žleby, now Loučná nad Desnou
Engelswald: Mošnov
Engelthal: Jesenný
Enkengrün: Jankovice, p. of Teplá
Ensenbruck: Povodí, p. of Třebeň
Epperswagen: Nepřívaz, now Libavá MTA (e)
Erdberg: Hrádek (Znojmo District)
Erdmannsdorf: Nové Zálužné, now Radkov (Opava District)
Erdweis: Nová Ves nad Lužnicí
Erlitz: Orlice, p. of Letohrad
Ermelei: Jermaly, now Kaplice (e)
Ermesgrün: Smrčina, p. of Plesná
Ernstberg: Arnoštka, p. of Vimperk
Ernstbrunn: Arnoštov, p. of Křišťanov
Ertischowitz: Rtišovice, p. of Milín
Esche: Eš
Eschen: Jasenná (Náchod District)
Eschowitz: Čečkovice, p. of Bor (Tachov District)
Espenthor: Olšová Vrata, p. of Karlovy Vary
Esseklee: Nesachleby, now Znojmo
Eulau: Jílové
Eule:
Jílové u Prahy
Sovín, now Albrechtice v Jizerských horách
Eulenberg: Sovinec, p. of Jiříkov (Bruntál District)
Eulhütten: Sova, now Hartmanice (Klatovy District) (e)
Eywan: Evaň

F

Falgendorf (Falkendorf): Horka u Staré Paky
Falkenau:
Falknov, p. of Kytlice
Sokolíčko, p. of Stonařov
Falkenau an der Eger: Sokolov
Falkendorf: Děčín XXVIII-Folknáře
Fassattengrün: Božetín, p. of Nový Kostel
Felden: Pole, p. of Jablonné v Podještědí
Feldkretschen: Krčmov, now Adršpach
Feldsberg: Valtice
Ferbenz: Rvenice, p. of Postoloprty
Ferbka: Vrbka, p. of Postoloprty
Ferchenhaid: Borová Lada
Ferdinandsdorf: Ferdinandov, p. of Choustníkovo Hradiště
Ferdinandsthal: Ferdinandov, p. of Hejnice (Liberec District)
Fichtau: Smrčná, p. of Nová Bystřice
Fichtenbach: Bystřice, now Česká Kubice (e)
Fichtenheid: Smrčná, p. of Svatá Maří
Filz: Slatina, p. of Horní Vltavice (e)
Finkendorf: Polesí, p. of Rynoltice
Fischbach: Rybná, p. of Pernink
Fischern:
Hranice V-Rybáře 
Rybáře, p. of Karlovy Vary
Stěžerov, p. of Hořice na Šumavě
Fischhäusel: Hostěrádky, now Vranovská Ves
Flecken: Fleky, p. of Chudenín
Fleißen: Plesná
Fleissheim: Horní Borková, now Horní Planá (e)
Fleyh: Fláje, p. of Český Jiřetín
Flöhau: Blšany
Flößberg: Plešivec, p. of Český Krumlov
Försterhäuser: Myslivny, now Boží Dar
Fonsau: Vonšov, p. of Skalná
Forbes: Borovany
Forstbad: Lázně Fořt, now Rudník (Trutnov District)
Fösselhof: Svachova Lhotka, p. of Mirkovice
Frain: Vranov nad Dyjí
Frainersdorf: Vranovská Ves
Frainspitz: Branišovice
Frankenhammer: Prague-Liboc
Frankenhammer: Liboc, p. of Kraslice
Frankstadt: Nový Malín
Frankstadt (unter dem Radhoscht): Frenštát pod Radhoštěm
Franowa: Vránov, p. of Staňkov (Domažlice District)
Franzberg:
Františkov, now Velké Kunětice
Františkův Vrch, p. of Huntířov
Franzdorf: Františkov, p. of Blížejov
Franzendorf: Liberec X-Františkov
Franzensbad: Františkovy Lázně
Franzensthal: Františkov, p. of Kvilda
Franzenthal-Ulgersdorf: Františkov nad Ploučnicí
Franzthal: Dolina, p. of Vilémov (Děčín District)
Fratting: Vratěnín
Frauenberg:
Hluboká nad Vltavou
Panenská Hůrka, p. of Bílý Kostel nad Nisou
Frauendorf: Panenská, p. of Jemnice
Frauenreith: Svobodka, p. of Halže
Frauenreuth: Kopanina, p. of Nový Kostel
Frauenthal:
Frantoly, now Loučovice (e)
Frantoly, p. of Mičovice
Pohled (Havlíčkův Brod District)
Frauschile: Vrahožily, p. of Rtyně nad Bílinou
Frei Hermersdorf: Svobodné Heřmanice
Freiberg in Böhmen: Příbram
Freiberg (in Mähren): Příbor
Freidau: Frýdava, now Přední Výtoň
Freidorf (Freydorf):
Svobodín, p. of Dolní Bousov
Svobodná Ves, now Úštěk
Freiheit (an der Aupa): Svoboda nad Úpou
Freiheitsau: Háj ve Slezsku
Freiheitsberg: Svobodín, now Vernířovice (e)
Freihöls: Stará Lhota, p. of Nýrsko
Freihofen: Svobodné Dvory, p. of Hradec Králové
Freistadt: Fryštát, p. of Karviná
Freistadtl: Fryšták
Freistein: Podhradí nad Dyjí
Freiung: Lipka, p. of Vimperk
Freiwaldau: Jeseník
Freudenberg: Veselé (Děčín District)
Freudenheim: Veselíčko 1. díl, p. of Veselé (Děčín District)
Freudenthal: Bruntál
Friedau: Frýdava, now Frymburk
Friedberg: Frymburk
Friedeberg: Žulová
Friedek (Friedeck): Frýdek, p. of Frýdek-Místek
Friedek-Mistek: Frýdek-Místek
Friedenau: Mírovka, p. of Havlíčkův Brod
Friedersdorf: Čaková
Friedersreuth: Pastviny, p. of Hranice (Cheb District)
Friedland an der Mohra: Břidličná
Friedland (an der Ostrawitza): Frýdlant nad Ostravicí
Friedland in Böhmen: Frýdlant
Friedrichschlag (Fridretschlag): Bedřichov, p. of Horní Stropnice
Friedrichsdorf: Bedřichov, p. of Oskava
Friedrichshain: Liberec XXXIV-Bedřichovka
Friedrichshof: Bedřichov, now Rybník (Domažlice District) (e)
Friedrichshütten: Nová Huť, p. of Nemanice
Friedrichsthal: Chalupy, p. of Všeruby (Domažlice District)
Friedrichswald:
Bedřichov (Jablonec nad Nisou District)
Hnátnice
Friedstein: Frýdštejn
Friesendorf: Březná, p. of Štíty
Frischau: Břežany (Znojmo District)
Frischau: Fryšava pod Žákovou horou
Fritschowitz: Fryčovice
Frobelhof: Lední Domky, now Sosnová (Opava District)
Frohenbruck (an der Lainsitz): Veselí nad Lužnicí
Fröhlichsdorf: Veselí, p. of Štětí
Frohnau: Vranov, now Rovná (Sokolov District) (e)
Fröllersdorf: Jevišovka
Frühbuß: Přebuz
Fuchsberg: Lišcí Hora, p. of Rybník (Domažlice District) (e)
Füllerdörfel: Vesnička, p. of Prysk
Füllstein: Bohušov
Fünfhunden: Pětipsy
Fünfzighuben: Padesát Lánů, now Potštát
Fürstenbruck: Kněžmost
Fürstenhut: Knížecí Pláně, p. of Borová Lada (e)
Fürstenwalde: Knížecí, p. of Velký Šenov
Fürthel: Brůdek, p. of Všeruby (Domažlice District)
Fugau: Fukov, now Šluknov (e)
Fulnek: Fulnek
Funkenstein: Háje, p. of Kolová
Fussdorf: Rantířov

G

Gabel:
Jablonné v Podještědí
Vidly, p. of Vrbno pod Pradědem
Gabel an der Adler: Jablonné nad Orlicí
Gaberhäuser: Podstrání, p. of Rovná (Sokolov District)
Gaberle: Javoří, p. of Hartmanice (Klatovy District)
Gabersdorf: Libeč, p. of Trutnov
Gabhorn: Javorná, p. of Bochov
Gablonz:
(an der Neiße): Jablonec nad Nisou
Jabloneček, p. of Ralsko
Gabrielahütten: Gabrielina Huť, now Kalek (e)
Gabrielendorf: Gabrielka, p. of Kamenice nad Lipou
Gaierle: Kavrlík, p. of Kašperské Hory
Gaischwitz: Kýšovice, p. of Výsluní
Gaisdorf: Kyžlířov, p. of Potštát
Gaiwitz: Kyjovice (Znojmo District)
Galtenhof: Branka, p. of Halže
Gamnitz: Jemnice, p. of Tisová (Tachov District)
Gängerhof: Chodov (Karlovy Vary District)
Gansau: Pravětín, p. of Vimperk
Gansauerhaid: Pravětínská Lada, now Borová Lada (e)
Garschönthal: Úvaly, p. of Valtice
Gärten: Zahrady, p. of Krásná Lípa
Gartitz: Skorotice, p. of Ústí nad Labem
Gässing: Jesen
Gaßnitz: Jesenice, p. of Okrouhlá (Cheb District)
Gastorf: Hoštka
Gatterschlag: Kačlehy
Gauendorf: Mokré, p. of Litvínovice
Gaya (Geyen): Kyjov
Gayer: Gajer, p. of Janov (Svitavy District)
Gebharz: Skalka, p. of Nová Bystřice
Gebirgskamnitz: Horská Kamenice, p. of Železný Brod
Gebirgsneudorf: Nová Ves v Horách
Gehaag: Háje, p. of Cheb
Gehae: Háj, p. of Radonice (Chomutov District)
Gehäng: Láz, p. of Nová Pec
Geiersberg: Letohrad
Geiersgraben: Čertův Důl, now Zdobnice
Geislersfeld: Lomy, now Supíkovice
Georgendorf: Český Jiřetín
Georgengrund: Jirský Důl, now Staré Buky (e)
Georgenthal: Jiřetín pod Bukovou
Georgswalde: Jiříkov
Geppersdorf:
Kopřivná
Linhartovy, p. of Město Albrechtice
Geppertsau: Keprtovice, now Libavá MTA (e)
Gerbetschlag: Herbertov, p. of Vyšší Brod
Gereuthern: Jitronice, now Pohorská Ves (e)
Gerlsdorf: Jerlochovice, p. of Fulnek
Gersdorf:
Kerhartice, p. of Česká Kamenice
Mezihoří, p. of Blatno (Chomutov District)
Gerstenfeld: Ječmeniště, now Vrbovec (e)
Gerten: Krty
Gesen: Jesení, p. of Čachrov
Geserzen: Jezerce, p. of Stříbro
Gesmesgrün: Osvinov, p. of Stráž nad Ohří
Gesna: Jezná, p. of Úlice
Gessing: Jesínky, p. of Bochov
Gesteinigt: Kamenná, p. of Jílové
Gestrzeby (Jestreby): Jestřebí (Šumperk District)
Gestob: Ždov, p. of Radonice (Chomutov District)
Geweihtenbrunn: Boží Voda, now Liběchov
Gewitsch: Jevíčko
Gfell: Kfely, p. of Ostrov (Karlovy Vary District)
Gibacht: Pozorka, p. of Nejdek
Gibian: Jivjany, p. of Velký Malahov
Giebau: Jívová
Giessdorf: Jišterpy, p. of Chotiněves
Gießhübel:
Kyselov, now Olomouc
Olešnice v Orlických horách
Vyskytná nad Jihlavou
Gießhübl (Gießhübel):
Boršov, now Malšín
Stružná
Gießhübl-Sauerbrunn (Gießhübel-Puchstein): Kyselka
Gilschwitz: Kylešovice, p. of Opava
Girnberg: Zadní Milíře, p. of Milíře
Girsch: Krsy
Girschen: Jeřeň, p. of Valeč (Karlovy Vary District)
Girschowa: Krsov, p. of Ostrov u Bezdružic
Girsig: Jiříkov (Bruntál District)
Gitschin: Jičín
Glasau: Neblašov, p. of Chodský Újezd
Glasberg: Sklená, p. of Kraslice
Glasdörfel: Sklené, p. of Malá Morava
Glaselsdorf: Sklené (Svitavy District)
Glasern: Klažary, p. of Kamenná (České Budějovice District)
Glashof: Skláře, p. of Hořice na Šumavě
Glashütten:
Hutě, p. of Cejle
Skelná Huť, now Horní Planá (e)
Skláře, p. of Vimperk
Glasshüte: Skelná Huť, now Libavá MTA (e)
Glatzen: Kladská, p. of Mariánské Lázně
Gleimen: Hliněná, p. of Malšovice
Glemkau: Hlinka (Bruntál District)
Glieden: Lideň, p. of Málkov (Chomutov District)
Glitschau: Klíčov, p. of Kočov
Glöckelberg: Zvonková, now Horní Planá
Glomnitz: Hlavnice
Glosau: Dlažov
Gmünd (Gmünd-Bahnhof, Gmünd III): České Velenice
Gnadlersdorf: Hnanice
Gnoitz: Hnojice
Gobitschau: Chabičov, p. of Šternberk
Godrusch: Jadruž, p. of Stráž (Tachov District)
Göding: Hodonín
Göhe: Háj, p. of Habartice (Liberec District)
Göhren: Klíny
Gojau: Kájov
Goldberg: Zlatá, now Boletice MTA (e)
Goldbrunn
Balda, now Stašov (Svitavy District)
Zlatá Studna, now Horská Kvilda (e)
Golddorf: Zlatá, p. of Kynšperk nad Ohří
Goldeck: Staré Město (Šumperk District)
Goldendorf: Zlatá
Goldenhöhe: Zlatý Kopec, p. of Boží Dar
Goldenfluß: Zlatý Potok, p. of Malá Morava
Goldenkron: Zlatá Koruna
Goldenöls: Zlatá Olešnice (Trutnov District)
Goldenstein: Branná
Goldwag: Řešanov, now Planá (Tachov District)
Gollitsch: Kaliště, p. of Bohdalovice
Göllitz: Jedlice, now Nové Hrady (České Budějovice District) (e)
Gollnetschlag: Klení, p. of Benešov nad Černou
Goltsch Jenikau: Golčův Jeníkov
Görkau: Jirkov
Görsdorf: Loučná, p. of Hrádek nad Nisou
Gösen: Kadaňská Jeseň, p. of Kadaň
Gossau:
Kosov, p. of Bor (Tachov District)
Kosov, p. of Jihlava
Gossengrün: Krajková
Goßmaul: Kosmová, p. of Toužim
Gossolup: Horní Kozolupy
Gotschdorf: Hošťálkovy
Göttersdorf: Boleboř
Gottesgab: Boží Dar
Gottmannsgrün: Trojmezí, p. of Hranice (Cheb District)
Gottschau: Kočov
Götzdorf: Božíkov, p. of Zákupy
Grabau: Hrabová, p. of Ostrava
Graben: Strouhy, now Boletice MTA (e)
Graber: Kravaře (Česká Lípa District)
Gradlitz: Choustníkovo Hradiště
Gräfenberg: Gräfenberk, now Jeseník
Grafendorf:
Hrabětice
Hrabětice, p. of Janov nad Nisou
Hrabětice, p. of Jeseník nad Odrou
Grafenhütte: Hraběcí Huť, p. of Kvilda
Grafenried: Lučina
Grafenstein: Grabštejn
Grambach: Potočná, p. of Číměř
Granesau: Chranišov, p. of Nové Sedlo (Sokolov District)
Gränzendorf: Hraničná, p. of Janov nad Nisou
Gränzdorf: Hraničky, p. of Uhelná
Gränzgrund: Hraničná, now Skorošice (e)
Grasengrün: Hájek (Karlovy Vary District)
Grasfurth: Brod, now Stožec (e)
Graslitz: Kraslice
Grasset: Jehličná, p. of Královské Poříčí (e)
Gratschen: Radešín, p. of Chuderov
Grätz: Hradec nad Moravicí
Gratzen: Nové Hrady (České Budějovice District)
Graupen: Krupka
Greifendorf: Hradec nad Svitavou
Grenzdörfel: Pomeznice, p. of Meziměstí
Griesbach: Křemenitá, now Tatrovice
Gritschau: Krčín, p. of Horní Stropnice
Grodischt: Hradiště, p. of Těrlicko
Gröditz-Neudorf: Hradec-Nová Ves
Gröna: Křínov, p. of Planá (Tachov District)
Gröschlmaut: Grešlové Mýto
Groschau: Chrašťany, p. of Krásný Dvůr
Groß Aujezd (Groß Augezd, Groß Aujest): Velký Újezd
Groß Aupa: Velká Úpa, p. of Pec pod Sněžkou
Großbieltsch: Běleč nad Orlicí
Groß Bechar: Běchary
Groß Beranau: Velký Beranov
Groß Bistrzitz: Valašská Bystřice
Groß Bittesch: Velká Bíteš
Großblanitz: Blanice, p. of Bavorov
Groß Blatnitz (Groß Blattnitz): Blatnice pod Svatým Antonínkem
Großblatzen: Blatce
Groß Bocken: Velká Bukovina
Groß Borowitz: Borovnice (Trutnov District)
Groß Bürglitz: Velký Vřešťov
Groß Butschin: Velká Bučina, p. of Velvary
Groß Cakowitz: Prague-Čakovice
Groß Cejtitz: Čejetice, p. of Mladá Boleslav
Groß Cekau: Čakov (České Budějovice District)
Groß Cermna: Velká Čermná, p. of Čermná nad Orlicí
Groß Darkowitz: Darkovice
Gross Deschau: Velký Dešov, now Dešov
Groß Dittersdorf: Čermná, now Libavá MTA (e)
Großdorf:
Veliká Ves (Prague-East District)
Velká Ves, p. of Broumov
Groß Drewitsch: Velký Dřevíč, p. of Hronov
Groß Drossen: Velké Strážné, now Světlík (e)
Grosse: Hrozová, p. of Rusín
Großenteich: Velký Rybník, p. of Hroznětín
Großfürwitz: Vrbice (Karlovy Vary District)
Groß Gallein: Velké Skaliny, p. of Benešov nad Černou
Groß Glockersdorf: Klokočov, p. of Vítkov
Groß Gorschin: Velký Horšín, now Rybník (Domažlice District) (e)
Groß Grillowitz: České Křídlovice, now Božice
Groß Gropitzreith (Großgropitzreith): Velký Rapotín, p. of Tachov
Groß Grünau: Velký Grunov, p. of Brniště
Groß Gürsch: Krsy
Großhaid: Velký Bor
Groß Hammer (Großhammer): Velké Hamry
Groß Heilendorf: Postřelmov
Groß Heinrichschlag: Velký Jindřichov, p. of Benešov nad Černou
Groß Hermsdorf: Heřmanice u Oder
Großherrlitz (Groß Herrlitz): Velké Heraltice
Groß Herrndorf: Kněžice (Chrudim District)
Großherrndorf (Großhirndorf): Kněžice, p. of Jablonné v Podještědí
Groß Hitschitz: Velké Hydčice
Groß Hluschitz: Hlušice
Gross Holletitz: Holedeč
Großhorka: Hrubá Horka, p. of Železný Brod
Groß Hoschütz: Velké Hoštice
Groß Hrabowa: Hrabová, p. of Ostrava
Groß Hubina: Velký Hubenov, p. of Snědovice
Groß Jentsch (Groß-Jenc): Jeneč
Groß Jessenitz: Velká Jesenice
Groß Jirna: Jirny
Groß Jober: Velká Javorská, p. of Žandov
Groß Karlowitz: Velké Karlovice
Groß Kaudern: Chuderov
Groß Kletzan: Klecany
Groß Kostomlat: Kostomlaty nad Labem
Groß Kraschtitz: Chraštice
Groß Krosse: Velká Kraš
Groß Kuchel: Prague-Velká Chuchle
Groß Kuntschitz: Kunčice pod Ondřejníkem
Großkunzendorf: Kunčice, p. of Ostrava
Groß Kunzendorf: Velké Kunětice
Groß Latein: Slatinice
Groß Lhotta: Lhota (Zlín District)
Großloh: Velký Luh
Großlohowitz: Hlohovice
Groß Losenitz (Groß Lossenitz): Velká Losenice
Groß Lowtschitz: Lovčice (Hodonín District)
Großlubigau (Groß Lubigau): Velký Hlavákov, p. of Valeč (Karlovy Vary District)
Gross Lukau: Lukov (Zlín District)
Großmallowa: Velký Malahov
Großmalowitz: Malovice
Groß Meierhöfen: Velké Dvorce, p. of Přimda
Großmergthal: Mařenice
Gross Meseritsch (Großmeseritsch): Velké Meziříčí
Großmohrau: Velká Morava, p. of Dolní Morava
Groß Morschin (Gross-Morzin): Mořina
Groß Nehwizd: Nehvizdy
Gross Niemtschitz: Velké Němčice
Groß Olbersdorf: Velké Albrechtice
Groß Olkowitz: Oleksovice
Groß Opatowitz: Velké Opatovice
Groß Opolan: Opolany
Groß Orzechau: Velký Ořechov
Groß Otschehau: Očihov
Groß Pantschen: Velký Pěčín, p. of Dačice
Gross Pawlowitz: Velké Pavlovice
Groß Petersdorf: Horní Vražné, now Vražné
Groß Peterswald: Petřvald (Nový Jičín District)
Groß Petrowitz: Petrovice
Groß Pohlom: Velká Polom
Groß Poidl: Podolí, p. of Mohelnice
Großpopowitz: Velké Popovice
Groß Poreschin: Pořešín, p. of Kaplice
Groß Poric: Velké Poříčí
Groß Priesen (Großpriesen): Velké Březno
Groß Prossenitz: Velké Prosenice, now Prosenice
Groß Pschilep: Velké Přílepy
Groß Pulitz: Pulice, p. of Dobruška
Groß Raden: Radim, p. of Brantice
Groß Rammerschlag: Velký Ratmírov
Groß Rasel (Groß Raasel): Rájec (Šumperk District)
Groß Ritte: Řetová
Groß Schinian: Žíňany, p. of Soběhrdy
Groß Schönau (Großschönau): Velký Šenov
Groß Schüttüber: Velká Šitbor, p. of Milíkov (Cheb District)
Groß Schwadowitz: Velké Svatoňovice
Groß Seelowitz: Židlochovice
Groß Semtin: Semtín
Groß Senitz: Senice na Hané
Groß Sichdichfür: Velká Hleďsebe
Groß Skal: Hrubá Skála
Groß Spinelsdorf: Velká Lesná, now Hradiště MTA (e)
Groß Steurowitz: Starovice
Groß Stohl: Velká Štáhle
Groß Strodau: Stradov, p. of Omlenice
Groß Tajax: Dyjákovice
Groß Teinitz: Velký Týnec
Groß Temelin: Temelín
Groß Trestny: Velké Tresné
Groß Tschakowitz: Čakovice
Großtschekau: Čakov (České Budějovice District)
Groß Tschernitz: Velká Černoc, p. of Měcholupy (Louny District)
Groß Tschernosek (Groß Czernosek): Velké Žernoseky
Groß Tschochau: Řehlovice
Groß Ullersdorf: Velké Losiny
Groß Umlowitz: Omlenice
Groß Uretschlag: Černíkov
Groß Urhau: Ořechov (Brno-Country District)
Groß Walten: Velký Valtinov
Groß Waltersdorf: Velká Střelná, now Libavá MTA (e)
Großwasser: Hrubá Voda, p. of Hlubočky
Großwehlen (Großwöhlen): Děčín XXX-Velká Veleň
Groß Werscheditz: Verušice, p. of Žlutice
Groß Wisternitz: Velká Bystřice
Groß Witschitz: Vitčice, p. of Veliká Ves (Chomutov District)
Groß Wonetitz: Bonětice, p. of Stráž (Tachov District)
Groß Wosek: Velký Osek
Groß Woslawitz: Oslavice
Groß Wosnalitz: Osinalice, p. of Medonosy
Großwossek: Velký Osek
Groß Wrbka: Hrubá Vrbka
Groß Wschelis: Velké Všelisy
Groß Würben: Velké Vrbno, now Staré Město (Šumperk District)
Groß Würbka (Groß Wrbka): Hrubá Vrbka
Groß Zdikau: Zdíkov
Groß Ziegenruck: Velký Kozí Hřbet, p. of Rejštejn
Groß Zmietsch: Smědeč, p. of Ktiš
Grottau: Hrádek nad Nisou
Grub: Jáma, p. of Mičovice
Grün
Doubrava, p. of Aš
Louka, p. of Nová Ves (Sokolov District)
Novina, p. of Sokolov
Zelená, p. of Skalná
Zelená Lhota, p. of Nýrsko
Grünau: Gruna
Grünberg:
Zelená Hora (Vyškov District)
Zelená Hora, p. of Kraslice
Grünlas: Loučky, p. of Nové Sedlo (Sokolov District)
Grünwald:
Pastviny, now Moldava (Teplice District) (e)
Zelený, p. of Úštěk
Grünwald an der Neiße: Mšeno nad Nisou, p. of Jablonec nad Nisou
Grulich: Králíky
Grumberg: Podlesí, p. of Malá Morava
Grunddorf: Dlouhá Ves, p. of Hynčina
Grundmühlen: Mlýny, p. of Hrob
Grussbach: Hrušovany nad Jevišovkou
Gschwendt: Světví, p. of Horní Stropnice
Gsenget: Pomezí
Gügel: Dolní Bukovina and Horní Bukovina, now Levín
Güntersdorf: Huntířov
Gürsch: Krsy
Guldenfurth: Brod nad Dyjí
Gumplitz: Kumpolec, p. of Tisová (Tachov District)
Gumpolds: Humpolec
Gundersdorf: Guntramovice, p. of Budišov nad Budišovkou
Gundrum: Komořany (Vyškov District)
Guratin: Krtín, p. of Skapce
Gurein: Kuřim
Gurenitz: Skoronice, p. of Bujanov
Gurim: Kouřim
Gurschdorf: Skorošice
Gurwitz: Krhovice
Gut Wellowitz: Bílovice
Gutbrunn: Dobrá Voda, now Jablonec nad Nisou
Gutenbrunn: Meziluží, p. of Horní Stropnice
Gutenfeld: Dobruška
Guthausen: Dobrá, p. of Stožec
Guttenfeld: Dobré Pole
Guttowitz (Kottowitz): Kotovice
Gutwasser: Dobrá Voda u Českých Budějovic

H

Haag: Zahrádka, p. of Rožmitál na Šumavě
Haan: Háj u Duchcova
Haardt: Staré Hobzí
Haatsch: Hať
Habakladrau: Ovesné Kladruby
Haber: Habřina, p. of Úštěk
Haberdorf: Ovesná, p. of Benešov nad Ploučnicí
Habern: Habry
Habersbirk: Habartov
Habicht: Jestřabí, now Libavá MTA (e)
Hablesreith: Havlov, now Rožmitál na Šumavě (e)
Habrina: Habřina
Habrowan:
Habrovany (Ústí nad Labem District)
Habrovany (Vyškov District)
Habrzi: Habří, p. of Řehlovice
Habstein (Habichstein): Jestřebí (Česká Lípa District)
Hackenhäuser: Sekerské Chalupy, p. of Stará Voda (Cheb District)
Hadruwa: Hadrava, p. of Chudenín
Hafnerluden: Lubnice (Znojmo District)
Hafnern: Klení
Hartenberg: Hřebeny, p. of Josefov (Sokolov District)
Härtlings: Horepník
Hagengrün: Zeleny Háj, p. of Vojtanov
Hagensdorf: Ahníkov
Haid:
Bor (Tachov District)
Bor, p. of Sadov
Haida: Nový Bor
Haidberg: Vřesná, now Frymburk
Haidedörfel: Boreček, p. of Ralsko
Haidl:
Lomek, now Boletice MTA (e)
Zhůří, p. of Rejštejn
Hainbuchen: Habřina
Haindorf:
Hajnice
Hejnice (Liberec District)
Hainspach: Lipová (Děčín District)
Haje: Háje nad Jizerou
Halbendorf: Polouvsí, p. of Jeseník nad Odrou
Halbgebäu: Podilna
Halbmeil: Rozhraní
Halbstadt: Meziměstí
Hallenkau: Halenkov
Halmgrün: Podlesí, p. of Sadov
Hals: Halže
Hammer: Hamr, p. of Litvínov
Hammer am See: Hamr na Jezeře
Hammerhäuseln: Hamrníky, p. of Mariánské Lázně
Hammern:
České Hamry, p. of Strážov (Klatovy District)
Hamry (Klatovy District)
Hammerstadt: Vlastějovice
Hamstein: Hamštejn, p. of Koberovy
Hangendorf: Svahy, p. of Planá (Tachov District)
Hangenstein: Skály, p. of Horní Město
Hannersdorf: Jindrišská
Hannsdorf: Hanušovice
Haratitz: Haratice, p. of Plavy
Hardetschlag: Hartunkov, p. of Benešov nad Černou
Hareth: Horany
Harlosee: Horní Polžice, p. of Bezdružice
Harrachsdorf:
Harrachov
Harrachov, p. of Rýmařov
Harrachsthal: Harrachov, p. of Šluknov
Hart: Lesina, p. of Třebeň
Harta: Podhůří, p. of Vrchlabí
Hartessenreuth: Hartoušov, p. of Nebanice
Hartlas: Lesinka, p. of Třebeň
Hartmanitz: Hartmanice (Klatovy District)
Hartmannsgrün: Lučiny, p. of Doupovské Hradiště
Hartowitz: Hrdějovice
Haschowa: Hašov, p. of Horšovský Týn
Hasel: Líska, p. of Česká Kamenice
Haselbach: Lísková, p. of Nemanice
Haselberg: Lískovec, now Nemanice (e)
Hasenburg: Hazmburk (castle)
Haslau: Hazlov
Haslicht: Varhošť, now Libavá MTA (e)
Haßlitz: Haslice, p. of Homole u Panny
Hatschein: Hejčín, p. of Olomouc
Hatzles: Hodslav, now Vyšší Brod (e)
Hau: Horní Pochlovice, p. of Kaceřov (Sokolov District)
Hauenstein: Horní Hrad, p. of Krásný Les (Karlovy Vary District)
Hauptmannsdorf: Hejtmánkovice
Hausbrunn: Úsobrno
Hausdorf: Hukovice, p. of Bartošovice
Hawlovitz: Havlovice
Hawran: Havraň
Hegeholz: Hajniště, now Jeníkov (Teplice District) (e)
Hegewald: Hajniště, p. of Nové Město pod Smrkem
Heideburg: Borohrádek
Heidenpiltsch: Bílčice
Heidenstein: Kámen (Děčín District)
Heidles: Borek
Heilbrunn: Hojná Voda, p. of Horní Stropnice
Heiligen: Světce, p. of Tachov
Heiligenberg: Svatý Kopeček, p. of Olomouc
Heiligenkreuz:
Chodský Újezd
Svatý Kříž, now Cheb
Svatý Kříž, p. of Havlíčkův Brod
Újezd Svatého Kříže, p. of Bělá nad Radbuzou
Heiligenulrich: Světce
Heiligkreuz: Újezd u Svatého Kříže
Heindorf:
Hájov, p. of Příbor
Hejnov, p. of Holčovice
Heinersdorf am Jeschken: Liberec XXIV-Pilínkov
Heinersdorf an der Tafelfichte: Jindřichovice pod Smrkem
Heinitz: Hejnice (Ústí nad Orlicí District)
Heinrichs: Velká Bíteš
Heinrichsberg: Jindřichova Hora, p. of Klenčí pod Čerchovem
Heinrichschlag: Jindřiš, p. of Rodvínov
Heinrichsdorf: Jindřichova Ves, p. of Kalek
Heinrichsgrün: Jindřichovice (Sokolov District)
Heinrichsheid: Jindřichovice
Heinrichsöd: Hrdoňov, now Frymburk
Heinrichsthal: Jindřichov (Šumperk District)
Heinzendorf:
Henčov, p. of Jihlava
Hynčice (Náchod District)
Hynčice, p. of Město Albrechtice
Hynčice, p. of Vražné
Heinzendorf an der March: Hynčice nad Moravou, p. of Hanušovice
Heinzhof: Hynčina
Helmbach: Michlova Huť, p. of Vimperk
Hemmehübel: Kopec, p. of Staré Křečany
Hengstererben: Hřebečná, p. of Abertamy
Henne: Huníkov, p. of Česká Kamenice
Henneberg: Borová, p. of Bolatice
Hennersdorf:
Dolní Branná
Dubnice
Jindřichov (Bruntál District)
Jindřichov, p. of Lučany nad Nisou
Heraletz:
Herálec (Havlíčkův Brod District)
Herálec (Žďár nad Sázavou District)
Heraltitz: Heraltice
Herautz: Heroltice, p. of Štíty
Herbau: Hrbov, p. of Polná
Herbitz: Hrbovice, p. of Chlumec (Ústí nad Labem District)
Herbstwiese: Děčín VI-Letná
Herdly: Hrdly, p. of Bohušovice nad Ohří
Herlsdorf: Heroltovice, p. of Město Libavá
Hermanitz: Heřmanice (Náchod District)
Hermanmestec (Hermanmiestetz): Heřmanův Městec
Hermannschlag: Kuří, p. of Benešov nad Černou
Hermannsdorf: Heřmanov, p. of Teplá
Hermannseifen: Rudník (Trutnov District)
Hermannsgrün: Heřmanov
Hermannshütte: Heřmanova Huť
Hermannstadt: Heřmanovice
Hermannstädtel: Heřmanův Městec
Hermannsthal: Jeřmanice
Hermersdorf:
Heřmanov (Děčín District)
Kamenná Horka
Hermitz: Heřmanice, p. of Starý Jičín
Hermsdorf:
Heřmanice (Liberec District)
Heřmanice, p. of Žandov
Heřmanice v Podještědí, p. of Jablonné v Podještědí
Heřmaničky, p. of Česká Lípa
Heřmánkovice
Heřmánky
Herrlich: Hrdlovka
Herrndorf: Kněževes (Rakovník District)
Herrnsdorf: Heřmanice, p. of Králíky
Herrnskretschen: Hřensko
Herrnwalde: Panský, p. of Staré Křečany
Herscheditz: Herstošice, p. of Bochov
Herschichlau: Hřešihlavy, p. of Kladruby (Rokycany District)
Herschmanitz: Heřmanice, p. of Ostrava
Hertin: Rtyně v Podkrkonoší
Hertine: Rtyně nad Bílinou
Hertitz: Hertice, p. of Dolní Životice
Herzogwald: Lesy, now Budišov nad Budišovkou
Hesselsdorf: Hošťka
Hetschigau: Hostíčkov, p. of Chodová Planá
Hettau: Hetov
Heuhof: Sruby
Heumahd: Senožaty
Hielgersdorf: Severní, p. of Lobendava
Hilbersdorf: Heroltice, p. of Jihlava
Hilbeten: Hylváty
Hillau: Hýlov, p. of Klimkovice
Hillemühl 1. Teil: Mlýny, p. of Kytlice
Hillemühl 2. Teil: Hillův Mlýn, p. of Kytlice
Hillersdorf: Holčovice
Himmelreich: Nebesa, p. of Aš
Himmlisch Ribnai: Nebeská Rybná
Hinkowitz: Hynkovice
Hinterglöckelberg: Zadní Zvonková, now Horní Planá
Hinterhaid: Zadní Bor, now Boletice MTA (e)
Hinterhammer: Zadní Hamry
Hinterhäuser: Zadní Chalupy
Hinterheuraffl: Zadní Výton
Hinter Kotten: Zadní Chodov
Hinterstift: Další Lhota, now Horní Planá
Hinterstrietesch: Zadní Střítež
Hinterwaldheim: Zadní Zahájí
Hinterwasser: Zářečí
Hinter Zinnwald: Cínovec, p. of Dubí
Hintring: Záhvozdí
Hirschau: Hyršov, p. of Všeruby (Domažlice District)
Hirschberg: Jelení, p. of Holčovice
Hirschberg am See: Doksy
Hirschbergen: Jelení, p. of Nová Pec
Hirschenstand: Jelení, now Nové Hamry
Hirschenstein: Jelenov, p. of Rejštejn
Hirschdorf: Jelenice, p. of Vítkov
Hirschfeld: Polná, p. of Hazlov
Hlinay: Hliňany, p. of Řehlovice
Hlinsko am Hostein: Hlinsko pod Hostýnem, p. of Bystřice pod Hostýnem
Hlinsko: Hlinsko
Hlintsch: Hlince
Hlinz: Hlinsko, p. of Rudolfov
Hlubocep: Prague-Hlubočepy
Hlubosch: Hluboš
Hluck: Hluk
Hniemitz: Hněvnice
Hnojnik (Hnoynik, Hnoinik): Hnojník
Hobitschau: Hlubočany
Hoch Aujest: Vysoký Újezd
Hochberg:
Morašov, now Dolní Dvořiště (e)
Vyšehoří
Hoch Chlumetz: Vysoký Chlumec
Hochchwojno: Vysoké Chvojno
Hochdobern: Dobrná
Hochdorf:
Nahořany, p. of Větřní
Vysoká, p. of Jihlava
Hochgarth: Obora, p. of Šindelová
Hochkirchen: Kostelec, p. of Fulnek
Hochlibin: Vysoká Libyně
Hochmorschin: Mořina
Hochofen: Vysoká Pec (Karlovy Vary District)
Hochpetsch: Bečov
Hochsemlowitz: Semněvice
Hochstadt an der Iser: Vysoké nad Jizerou
Hochstein: Hoštejn
Hochtann: Vysoká (Havlíčkův Brod District)
Hochwald:
Hukvaldy
Hvozd, now Boletice MTA (e)
Hochwessely (Hoch-Wessely): Vysoké Veselí (B,55)
Hodolein: Hodolany, p. of Olomouc
Hodonin: Hodonín, p. of Zdíkov
Hödlwald: Hejdlov, p. of Chvalšiny
Hödnitz: Hodonice (Znojmo District)
Höfen:
Dvorce (Jihlava District)
Dvory, p. of Loket
Hoffnung: Naděje, p. of Cvikov
Hof in Mähren: Dvorce (Bruntál District)
Höflas: Dvorek, p. of Třebeň
Höflein: Hevlín
Hoflenz: Mlýnický Dvůr, p. of Červená Voda (Ústí nad Orlicí District)
Höflitz:
Hvězdov, p. of Ralsko
Jedlka, p. of Malá Veleň
Hohenbruck:
Bojiště, p. of Trutnov
Třebechovice pod Orebem
Hohendorf:
Vysoká, p. of Dalovice (Karlovy Vary District)
Zádub, p. of Zádub-Závišín
Hohendorf-Abaschin: Zádub-Závišín
Hoheneck: Růžek, p. of Nová Ves (Liberec District)
Hohenelbe: Vrchlabí
Hohenfeld: Vysoké Pole
Hohenfluß: Vysoký Potok, p. of Malá Morava
Hohenfurth: Vyšší Brod
Hohenjamny: Vysoké Jamné
Hohenleipa: Vysoká Lípa, p. of Jetřichovice
Hohenmauth: Vysoké Mýto
Hohenofen: Vysoká Pec (Chomutov District)
Hohenrentsch: Revničov
Hohenschlag: Vysoká, now Světlík (e)
Hohenseibersdorf: Vysoké Žibřidovice, p. of Hanušovice
Hohenstadt: Zábřeh
Hohenstegen: Vysoké Lávky
Hohenstein: Unčín, p. of Krupka
Hohenstollen: Vysoká Štola, p. of Nejdek
Hohentann: Vysoká Jedle
Hohentrebetitsch: Vysoké Třebušice, p. of Krásný Dvůr
Hohenwald: Vysoký, now Heřmanice (Liberec District) (e)
Hohen Zetlisch: Vysoké Sedliště, p. of Planá (Tachov District)
Hohlen: Holany
Hoihäuser: Seníky
Holaschowitz: Holašovice, p. of Jankov (České Budějovice District)
Holitz:
Holice
Holice, p. of Olomouc
Holkau: Holkov, p. of Velešín
Höll: Peklo, p. of Stráž nad Ohří
Hölldörfel: Peklo
Höllegrund: Pekelský Důl, p. of Česká Kamenice
Holleischen: Holýšov
Holletitz: Hodousice, p. of Nýrsko
Holleschau: Holešov
Hollezrieb: Holostřevy, p. of Bor (Tachov District)
Hollin: Holyně, p. of Svojšín
Hollitz: see Holitz
Höllmühl: Peklo, p. of Stružná
Hollowing: Holubín, p. of Chodová Planá
Hollubau: Holubov
Hollunder: Chebzí, p. of Písečná (Jeseník District)
Holstein: Holštejn
Holoubkau (Holaubkau): Holoubkov
Holubschen: Holubeč
Holzbach: Plavno, now Krásný Les (Karlovy Vary District) (e)
Holzbachlehen: Léno
Holzhof: Dřevíkov
Holzschlag: Paseka, now Prášily (e)
Hombok: Hlubočky
Honau: Hanov
Honetschlag: Hodňov, p. of Horní Planá
Honnersdorf: Jindřichov, p. of Cheb
Honnersgrün: Hanušov, p. of Ostrov (Karlovy Vary District)
Honositz: Honezovice
Hopfendorf: Chmelík
Hopfengarten: Děčín XXV-Chmelnice
Horatitz: Hořetice, p. of Žiželice (Louny District)
Horaschdowitz (Horazdiowitz): Horažďovice
Horauschen: Horoušany
Horek: Horky, p. of Frýdštejn
Horenowes: Hořiněves
Horepnik (Horschepnik): Hořepník
Horitz (Horic): Hořice
Höritz (im Böhmerwalde): Hořice na Šumavě
Horschitzka: Hořičky
Horka:
Dolejší Hůrky, p. of Postoloprty
(an der Iser): Horky nad Jizerou
Horkau (Horka): Horka nad Moravou
Horn:
(Hornberg): Hory
Hory, p. of Oloví
Hora, now Hradiště MTA (e)
Horniemtsch: Horní Němčí
Hornschlag: Hodoň, now Loučovice (e)
Horosedl: Hořesedly
Horschau: Horšov
Horschelitz: Hořelice
Horschenz: Hořenec
Horschepnik: Hořepník
Hörschin: Hrzín
Horschitz: Hořice
Horschowitz (Horowitz, Horzowitz):
Hořovice
Hořovičky
Hörsin: Hrzín, p. of Nový Kostel
Hortau: Děčín XXXV-Lesná
Hörwitzel: Hořičky, now Boletice MTA (e)
Hoschialkowitz: Hoštálkovice, p. of Ostrava
Hoschlowitz: Hašlovice, p. of Větřní
Hoschtitz-Heroltitz: Hoštice-Heroltice
Hoslau:
Blata, p. of Nýrsko
Hvožďany (Domažlice District)
Hosposin: Hospozín
Hossau: Hosov, p. of Jihlava
Hossen (Hosen): Hostínov, now Polná na Šumavě (e)
Hossenreuth: Jenišov, now Horní Planá
Hostaschowitz: Hostašovice
Hostau: Hostouň (Domažlice District)
Hostaun: Hostouň (Kladno District)
Hostein: Hostýn
Hosterlitz:
Hostěradice
Hostice, p. of Ruda nad Moravou
Hosterschlag: Člunek
Hostes: Hostkovice, p. of Dačice
Hostialkow (Hostialkau): Hošťálková
Hösting: Hostim
Hostitz: Děčín XXIX-Hoštice nad Labem
Hostiwitz: Hostivice
Hostomitz:
Hostomice (Beroun District)
Hostomice (Teplice District)
Hostowitz: Hostovice, p. of Pardubice
Hottendorf: Hodkovice, now Jívka
Hottowies: Hostovice, p. of Ústí nad Labem
Hotzendorf: Hodslavice
Hotzenplotz: Osoblaha
Hrabin: Hrabyně
Hrabstwie: Hrabství, p. of Skřipov
Hradek: Hrádek (Klatovy District)
Hradzen: Hradec (Plzeň-South District)
Hraidisch: Hradiště nad Ohří, p. of Postoloprty
Hranitz: Hranice, p. of Karviná
Hriwitz: Hřivice
Hrobschitz: Hrobčice
Hrochow-Teinitz (Hrochowteinitz): Hrochův Týnec
Hronow: Hronov
Hrosinkau: see Alt-Hrosinkau
Hrottowitz: Hrotovice
Hrozna Lhotta: Hroznová Lhota
Hruschau: Hrušov, p. of Ostrava
Hruschowan:
Hrušovany (Chomutov District)
Hrušovany, p. of Polepy (Litoměřice District)
Hubene: Hubenov, p. of Kaplice
Hüblern: Houžná, p. of Lenora (Prachatice District)
Hühnerwasser: Kuřívody, p. of Ralsko
Hüttel: Chaloupky
Hüttenberg: Pastviny, now Deštné v Orlických horách (e)
Hüttendorf: Hutě
Huttendorf: Zálesní Lhota
Hüttenhof: Huťský Dvůr
Hüttmesgrün: Vrch
Hulken: Hluk
Hullein: Hulín
Hultschin: Hlučín
Hulwaken: Hulváky, p. of Ostrava
Hummel: Homole u Panny
Hummelberg: Tremsin
Hummeln: Homole (České Budějovice District)
Humpoletz: Humpolec
Humwald: Chlum
Hundorf: Hudcov, p. of Teplice
Hundshaberstift: Bozdova Lhota
Hundsruck: Hřbítek, now Loučovice (e)
Hungertuch: Hladov
Hunkowitz: Unkovice
Huntir: Huntířov
Hurka: Hůrka, p. of Jeseník nad Odrou
Hurkau: Hůrky
Hurkenthal: Hůrka, now Prášily (e)
Hurschippen: Hořipná, now Rožmberk nad Vltavou (e)
Hurschk: Hoštec, p. of Teplá
Hurz: Zhořec, p. of Bezdružice
Huschitz: Šumavské Hoštice
Hussinetz: Husinec (Prachatice District)
Hussowitz: Brno-Husovice
Hustienowitz: Huštěnovice
Hustopetsch (an der Betschwa): Hustopeče nad Bečvou
Hut: Klobuky
Hutberg: Hony, p. of Police nad Metují
Huttendorf: Zálesní Lhota, p. of Studenec (Semily District)
Hüttenhof: Huťský Dvůr, now Vimperk (e)
Hwiezdlitz: Hvězdlice
Hwozdian: Hvožďany (Příbram District)

I

Igel: Jihlava (river)
Iglau: Jihlava
Illemnik: Jilemník, p. of Havlíčkův Brod
Illeschowitz: Jilešovice, p. of Háj ve Slezsku
Imlikau: Jimlíkov, p. of Nová Role
Imling: Jimlín
Indic: Jindice, p. of Rašovice (Kutná Hora District)
Ingrowitz: Jimramov
Innergefild: Horská Kvilda
Innichen: Mchov, p. of Staré Sedliště
Innozenzidorf: Lesné, p. of Jiřetín pod Jedlovou
Irmsdorf: Jamartice, p. of Rýmařov
Irresdorf: Lštín, now Polná na Šumavě (e)
Irrgang: Bludná, p. of Pernink
Irritz: Jiřice u Miroslavi
Irschings: Jiřín, p. of Vyskytná nad Jihlavou
Itschina: Jičina, p. of Starý Jičín

J

Jablon: Jablonná, p. of Chyše
Jablonetz an der Iser: Jablonec nad Jizerou
Jablunka: Jablůnka
Jablunkau: Jablunkov
Jäckelthal: Údolí, now Frýdlant
Jagdhase: Kolná, p. of Brumovice (Opava District)
Jägerdörfel: Myslivny, now Mařenice
Jägerndorf: Krnov
Jägersdorf: Lada, p. of Česká Lípa
Jaispitz: Jevišovice
Jaktar: Jaktař, p. of Opava
Jakubschowitz: Jakubčovice, p. of Hradec nad Moravicí
Jalub: Jalubí
Jamles: Jamné, p. of Boršov nad Vltavou
Jamnei an der Adler: Jamné nad Orlicí
Jamnitz:
Jamnice, p. of Stěbořice
Jemnice
Janauschendorf: Janoušov
Jandles: Mošna, now Zbytiny
Janegg: Jeníkov (Teplice District)
Janessen: Jenišov
Jankau: Jankov (Benešov District)
Janketschlag (Jangetschlag): Jankov, now Hořice na Šumavě (e)
Jankowitz: Jankovice, p. of Letohrad
Janowitz:
Janovice
Janovice, p. of Dlouhá Ves (Klatovy District)
Janovice, p. of Pelhřimov
Janovice, p. of Polná
Janovice, p. of Rýmařov
Janovice, p. of Starý Jičín
(an der Angel): Janovice nad Úhlavou
Janovičky, p. of Zámrsk
Jansdorf: Janov (Svitavy District)
Jareschau (an der Naser): Jarošov nad Nežárkou
Jarkowitz: Jarkovice, p. of Velhartice
Jarmeritz (Jaromeritz): Jaroměřice nad Rokytnou
Jarmirn: Jaroměř, p. of Malonty
Jarohnowitz: Jarohněvice
Jaromieritz: Jaroměřice
Jaronin: Jaronín, p. of Brloh (Český Krumlov District)
Jasena: Jasenná (Náchod District)
Jassenitz: Jasenice, p. of Lešná
Jassenka: Horní Jasenka, p. of Vsetín
Jastersdorf: Jestřabí, p. of Fulnek
Jauernig: Javorník (Jeseník District)
Jauernig Dorf: Ves Javorník, now Javorník (Jeseník District)
Jawornitz: Javornice
Jechnitz: Jesenice (Rakovník District)
Jedownitz: Jedovnice
Jeedl: Jedlí
Jelemka: Jelemek, p. of Nebahovy
Jenewelt: Onen Svět, p. of Čachrov
Jenschowitz: Jenišovice (Jablonec nad Nisou District)
Jentsch: Jeneč, p. of Brťov-Jeneč
Jentschitz: Jenčice
Jerschmanitz: Jeřmanice
Jermer: Jaroměř
Jesau: Ježená
Jeschken: Ještěd (mountain)
Jeschkowitz: Jezdkovice
Jeseney (Jesenei): Jesenný
Jessenetz: Jesenec
Jessenitz: Jesenice (Prague-West District)
Jestrabi: Jestřabí v Krkonoších
Jetietitz: Jetětice
Jetschan: Děčany
Jeschin: Ješín, p. of Velvary
Jettenitz:
Dětenice
Řetenice, p. of Nicov
Jetzlau: Jeclov, p. of Velký Beranov
Jewan: Jevany
Jibka: Jívka
Jicinowes: Jičíněves
Jilau: Jílové u Držkova
Jinetz: Jince
Jirkau: Jirkov, p. of Železný Brod
Jistebnitz: Jistebnice
Jistey (Gistej): Jistebsko, p. of Pěnčín (Jablonec nad Nisou District)
Jitschin: Jičín
Joachimsdorf: Jáchymov, p. of Brniště
Joachimsthal: Jáchymov
Jogsdorf: Jakubčovice nad Odrou
Johanidorf: Johanka, p. of Kamenice nad Lipou
Johannaburg: Johanka, now Stará Červená Voda (e)
Johannesberg:
Janov nad Nisou
Janovičky, p. of Heřmánkovice
Janovka, p. of Velký Šenov
Svatý Jan nad Malší
Johannesdorf:
Janov, p. of Kočov
Janov, p. of Nový Bor
Janova Ves, p. of Pohorská Ves
Johannesfeld: Zadky, p. of Neplachovice
Johannesgunst: Janovice, p. of Rudník (Trutnov District)
Johanneskirchl: Kosteliště, p. of Všeruby (Domažlice District)
Johannesthal:
Janov (Bruntál District)
Janské Údolí, p. of Brloh (Český Krumlov District)
Liberec IX-Janův Důl
Johannisbad: Janské Lázně
Johnsbach (Jonsbach): Janská
Johnsdorf:
Habrovice, p. of Ústí nad Labem
Janov, p. of Litvínov
Janovice, now Jívka
Janovice v Podještědí
Janovice, p. of Kravaře
Jokelsdorf (Jockelsdorf):
Jakubovice
Jakubovice, p. of Dolní Čermná
Jokes: Jakubov, p. of Vojkovice (Karlovy Vary District)
Jonsdorf: Janov (Děčín District)
Josefihütte: Josefova Huť, now Planá (Tachov District)
Josefsburg: Josefovice, p. of Hrabyně
Josefschlag: Žižkovo Předměstí, now České Velenice
Josefsdorf:
Josefov (Hodonín District)
Josefov (Sokolov District)
Josefov, p. of Rožná
Josefovice, p. of Klimkovice
Svobodná Ves, p. of Horka I
Josefstadt:
Josefov, p. of Jaroměř
Prague-Josefov
Josefsthal:
Josefodol, p. of Světlá nad Sázavou
Josefův Důl (Jablonec nad Nisou District)
Josefswille: Mlatce, p. of Františkov nad Ploučnicí
Josephsthal: Josefův Důl (Mladá Boleslav District)
Joslowitz: Jaroslavice
Judendorf:
Přítkov, p. of Proboštov
Židněves
Julienau: Julín, p. of Úštěk
Julienheim (Julienhain): Hranice (České Budějovice District)
Juliusthal: Juliovka, p. of Krompach
Jungbuch: Mladé Buky
Jungbunzlau: Mladá Boleslav
Jungfern Berschan: Panenské Břežany
Jungferndorf:
Kobylá nad Vidnavkou
Panenská, now Petrovice (Ústí nad Labem District)
Jungfernteinitz: Panenský Týnec
Jung Smoliwetz: Mladý Smolivec
Jung Woschitz: Mladá Vožice
Juratin: Kurojedy, p. of Bor (Tachov District)
Jurau: Jírov, now Hradiště MTA (e)

K

Kaaden: Kadaň
Kabischowitz: Chabičovice, p. of Mirkovice
Kahau: Kahov, p. of Prachatice
Kahudowa: Kohoutov, p. of Bezdružice
Kahn über Bodenbach: Velké Chvojno
Kahr: Úžlabí, p. of Habartov
Kaile: Kyje
Kailowitz: Kajlovec, p. of Hradec nad Moravicí
Kainratsdorf: Kondratice, now Hořice na Šumavě (e)
Kainretschlag: Konratice, p. of Horní Stropnice
Kaiserswalde: Císařský, p. of Šluknov
Kaitz: Kyjice, now Vrskmaň (e)
Kaladey (Kaladei): Koloděje nad Lužnicí, p. of Týn nad Vltavou
Kalenitz: Chválenice
Kalkpodol: Vápenný Podol
Kallendorf: Chvalovice (Znojmo District)
Kallenitz: Kalenice
Kallich: Kalek
Kalischt: Kaliště (Pelhřimov District)
Kalmswiese: Děčín XVII-Jalůvčí
Kalsching: Chvalšiny
Kaltenbach: Nové Hutě
Kaltenbach: Studený, p. of Kunratice (Děčín District)
Kaltenbirken: Zahořánky, p. of Přídolí
Kaltenbrunn:
Studánky, p. of Všeruby (Domažlice District)
Studánky, p. of Vyšší Brod
Kaltenhof: Oblanov, p. of Trutnov
Kaltenlautsch: Studená Loučka, p. of Mohelnice
Kaltseifen: Studený Zejf, p. of Písečná (Jeseník District)
Kaltwasser: Studená Voda, p. of Božanov
Kalwitz: Kalovice, p. of Úštěk
Kamaik:
Kamýk (Litoměřice District)
Kamýk nad Vltavou
Kamberg: Kamberk
Kamen: Kámen (Pelhřimov District)
Kamenitschek (Kamenicek): Kameničky
Kamenik: Kamýk, p. of Švihov (Klatovy District)
Kameral Ellgoth: Komorní Lhotka
Kamiegl: Kamýk, p. of Bezdružice
Kamitz: Kamenka, p. of Odry
Kammer: Komora, p. of Holčovice
Kammerdorf: Lužná
Kammersgrün: Lužec, p. of Nejdek
Kamenitz:
Kamenice (Jihlava District)
Kamenice (Prague-East District)
(an der Linde): Kamenice nad Lipou
Kamenná (Třebíč District)
Trhová Kamenice
Kamentz: Kamenec, p. of Holasovice
Kamnitzleiten: Kamenická Stráň, p. of Růžová
Kamnitz-Neudörfel: Kamenická Nová Víska, p. of Česká Kamenice
Kanitz: Dolní Kounice
Kanowsko: Kanovsko, p. of Vlkoš (Přerov District)
Kapellen: Kapličky, now Loučovice (e)
Kapellenhäuser: Kaplice, p. of Lenora (Prachatice District)
Kapellner Waldhäuser: Kaplické Chalupy, now Přední Výtoň (e)
Kaplitz: Kaplice
Kapsch: Skapce
Karbitz: Chabařovice
Kardasch Retschitz: Kardašova Řečice
Kares: Kařez
Karlbachhütte: Karlova Huť, p. of Bělá nad Radbuzou
Karlowitz: Velké Karlovice
Karlsbad (Carlsbad): Karlovy Vary
Karlsberg:
Karlov, p. of Josefův Důl (Jablonec nad Nisou District)
Karlovec, p. of Bruntál
Karlsbrunn: Karle (Svitavy District)
Karlsburg: Kašperk
Karlsdorf:
Karlov pod Pradědem, p. of Malá Morávka
Karlov, p. of Bohušov
Karlshöfen: Karlův Dvůr
Karlslau: Karlovec, p. of Opava
Karlstein: Karlštejn
Karlsthal:
Karlovice (Bruntál District)
Karlovka, p. of Velká Bukovina
Karlswald: Liberec XXXV-Karlov pod Ještědem
Karolinsfeld: Liberec XVIII-Karlinky
Karolinenthal: Prague-Karlín
Karolinsthal (Carolinsthal, Karolinstal): Karlín, p. of Dolní Poustevna
Karolinthal: Peklo
Kartaus (Karthaus): Čertousy
Karthaus-Walditz: Valdice
Kartitz: Choratice, p. of Malšovice
Kartousy: (Horní Počernice) Prague 20
Kartouze: Královo Pole
Karwin: Karviná
Kaschitz: Kaštice
Kaschkowitz: Kaškovice, p. of Frýdštejn
Kassejowitz: Kasejovice
Kastlern: Hradovy
Katharein: Kateřinky, p. of Opava
Katharinaberg:
Hora Svaté Kateřiny
Kateřinov, now Polná
Katharinadorf: Kateřina, p. of Skalná
Katharinberg: Liberec XVII-Kateřinky
Katharinenthal: Kateřina, p. of Dolní Podluží
Katowitz: Katovice
Kattendorf: Kateřinice (Nový Jičín District)
Katusitz: Katusice
Katzendorf: Starojická Lhota, p. of Starý Jičín
Katzengrün: Kaceřov (Sokolov District)
Katzow: Kácov
Kaunitz: Kounice
Kaunowa: Kounov
Kaurzim (Kaurim): Kouřim
Kauth: Kout na Šumavě
Kauthen: Kouty, p. of Kravaře
Kautz: Chouč, p. of Hrobčice
Kawarn: Koberno, p. of Slezské Rudoltice
Kaznau (Kasenau, Kasnau): Kaznějov
Keilberg: Klínovec (mountain)
Kelch: Kalich
Kellne: see Bienendorf
Keltsch: Kelč
Keltschan: Kelčany
Ketten: Chotyně
Kellersdorf: Šimanov
Kerndorf: Jadrná, now Orlické Záhoří
Kernin: Krnín, p. of Chlumec (Český Krumlov District)
Kettowitz: Chotěbudice, p. of Krásný Dvůr
Ketzelsdorf:
Koclířov
Kocléřov, p. of Vítězná
Khaa: Kyjov, p. of Krásná Lípa
Khan: Chanov, p. of Obrnice
Kiefergratschen: Borová Krčma, now Vendolí
Kienberg: Loučovice
Kienhaid: Načetín I
Kienwald: Borovnice (Rychnov nad Kněžnou District)
Kieselhof: Čkyně
Kiesenreuth: Kříženec, p. of Planá (Tachov District)
Killitz (Kilitz): Chylice, p. of Útvina
Kinitz: Knínice (Jihlava District)
Kinitz-Tettau: Vchynice-Tetov, p. of Srní
Kinsberg: Hrozňatov, p. of Cheb
Kirchberg:
Kámen (Pelhřimov District)
Kostelní, p. of Kraslice
Kirchenbirk: Kostelní Bříza, p. of Březová (Sokolov District)
Kirchsassen: Rudná (Prague-West District)
Kirchschlag: Světlík
Kiritein: Křtiny
Kirsch: Krsy
Kirschbaum: Třešňovice (Třešňovec)
Kirwein: Skrbeň
Kitlitzdorf: Kytlice, now Citice (e)
Kladek: Kladky
Kittlitz (Kittelwitz): Kytlice
Kladen:
Kladné, p. of Kájov
Kladno
Kladener Ruben: Kladenské Rovné
Kladerlas: Kladruby, p. of Teplá
Kladrau: Kladruby (Tachov District)
Kladrub:
Kladruby (Benešov District)
(an der Elbe): Kladruby nad Labem
Klantendorf: Kujavy
Klapay (Klappay): Klapý
Klattau: Klatovy
Klattau Prager Vorstadt: Klatovy II
Klattau Reichsvorstadt: Klatovy III
Klattau Stadt: Klatovy I
Klattau Vorstadt: Klatovy V
Klattau Wiener Vorstadt: Klatovy IV
Klebsch: Chlebičov
Klein: Helvíkov
Klein Aicha (Kleinaicha): Dubice
Klein Augezd:
Malý Újezd
Újezdeček
Klein Aupa (Kleinaupa): Malá Úpa
Klein Aurim: Benátky
Klein Barchow: Barchůvek, p. of Měník
Klein Bieschitz: Zbešičky
Klein Blatzen: Blatečky
Klein Bocken: Malá Bukovina, p. of Velká Bukovina
Klein Bor (Kleinheid): Malý Bor
Klein Bösig: Bezdědice, p. of Bělá pod Bezdězem
Kleinbrand: Žďárky
Klein Borowitz: Borovnička
Klein Bressel: Vraclávek
Klein Bubna: Bubny, now Prague-Holešovice
Klein Bukovina: Malá Bukovina
Klein Cejtitz: Čejetičky, p. of Mladá Boleslav
Klein Cekau: Čakovec, p. of Čakov (České Budějovice District)
Klein Cerma: Malá Čermná nad Orlici
Klein Chischka: Chyšky
Klein Choteschau: Chotěšovičky
Klein Chotieschau: Chotěšovičky
Klein Tschernosek (Klein Czernosek): Malé Žernoseky
Klein Darkowitz: Darkovičky, p. of Hlučín
Klein Deschau: Malý Dešov, now Dešov
Kleindrossen: Malá Strašeň, now Světlík (e)
Klein Eicha: Dubice, p. of Česká Lípa
Klein Ellgoth: Dolní Lhota (Ostrava-City District)
Klein Fürwitz: Vrbička, p. of Vroutek
Klein Gallein: Pusté Skaliny, p. of Benešov nad Černou
Klein Glockersdorf: Klokočůvek, p. of Odry
Klein Gorschin: Malý Horšín
Klein Grabau: Hrabůvka, p. of Ostrava
Klein Grillowitz: Křídlůvky
Klein Gropitzreith: Malý Rapotín, p. of Tachov
Kleingrün: Drnovec, p. of Cvikov
Kleingrün: Malý Hrzín, p. of Stráž nad Ohří
Kleinhan: Malý Háj, p. of Hora Svaté Kateřiny
Klein Heilendorf: Postřelmůvek
Klein Heinrichschlag: Malý Jindřichov
Klein Hermsdorf: Hermánky
Klein Herrlitz: Malé Heraltice, p. of Velké Heraltice
Klein Hitschitz: Malé Hydčice, p. of Malý Bor
Klein Hluschitz: Hlušičky, p. of Hlušice
Klein Holetitz: Holedec
Kleinhorka: Malá Horka, p. of Železný Brod
Klein Hoschütz: Malé Hoštice, p. of Opava
Klein Hrabowa: Hrabůvka, p. of Ostrava
Klein Hubina: Malý Hubenov, now Želízy
Klein Iser: Jizerka, p. of Kořenov
Klein Kahn: Malé Chvojno, p. of Velké Chvojno
Klein Karlowitz: Malé Karlovice
Klein Kaudern: Chuderovec, p. of Chuderov
Klein Kinitz: Kníničky
Klein Körbitz: Malé Krhovice
Kleinkositz: Kosičky
Klein Krosse: Malá Kraš, now Velká Kraš
Klein Kuchel: Prague-Malá Chuchle
Klein Kuchlitz: Malý Chuchelec
Klein Kunzendorf: Kunčičky, p. of Ostrava
Kleinlangenau: Malý Lanov
Kleinlaschitz: Lažišťka, p. of Nebahovy
Klein Lhota: Hranice II-Lhotka 
Klein Lomnitz: Lomnička (Brno-Country District)
Kleinlubigau (Klein Lubigau): Malý Hlavákov, p. of Verušičky
Klein Meierhöfen: Malé Dvorce, p. of Přimda
Klein Mallowa: Malý Malahov
Klein Merathal: Mařeničky
Kleinmergthal: Mařeničky, p. of Mařenice
Klein Mohrau:
Malá Morava
Malá Morávka
Kleinnedanitz: Nedaničky
Klein Nemcitz: Kupařovice
Klein Nepodritz: Malé Nepodřice
Klein Neustift: Cerekvička, p. of Cerekvička-Rosice
Kleinniemtschitz: Nemčičky
Kleinnixdorf: Mikulášovičky, p. of Mikulášovice
Klein Olbersdorf: Albrechtičky
Klein Olkowitz: Oleksovičky
Klein Otschehau: Očihovec
Klein Pantschen: Malý Pěčín, p. of Dačice
Klein Petersdorf: Dolní Vražné, now Vražné
Klein Peterswald: Petřvaldík, p. of Petřvald (Nový Jičín District)
Klein Petrowitz:
Petrovičky
Petrovičky, p. of Týniště nad Orlicí
Klein Plandles: Horní Pláně
Klein Poidl: Podolíčko
Klein Popowitz: Modletice
Klein Poreschin: Pořešinec, p. of Kaplice
Klein Prennet: Spáleneček, p. of Česká Kubice
Kleinpriesen: Malé Březno (Most District)
Klein Priesen: Malé Březno (Ústí nad Labem District)
Klein Prossenitz: Malé Prosenice, now Prosenice
Klein Rammerschlag: Malý Ratmírov
Klein Ritte: Řetůvka
Klein Sbosch: Malé Zboží
Klein Schinian: Žínánky
Klein Schönau: Malý Šenov, p. of Velký Šenov
Klein Schönhof: Krásný Dvoreček, p. of Rokle
Klein Schokau: Malý Šachov, p. of Starý Šachov
Klein Schüttüber: Malá Šitbor, p. of Milíkov (Cheb District)
Klein Schwadowitz: Malé Svatoňovice
Klein Semlowitz: Zámelíc
Klein Senitz: Senička
Klein Sichdichfür: Malá Hleďsebe, p. of Velká Hleďsebe
Kleinskal: Malá Skála
Klein Sliwno: Mečeříž
Klein Spinelsdorf: Malá Lesná
Klein Stiebnitz: Zdobnička
Klein Stohl: Malá Štáhle
Klein Studnitz: Studénky, p. of Puklice
Klein Tajax: Dyjákovičky
Klein Teinitz: Týneček, p. of Olomouc
Klein Tesswitz: Dobšice
Kleinthal: Údolíčko
Klein Trestny: Malé Tresné
Kleintschekau: Čakovec
Klein Tschernitz: Malá Černoc
Klein Tschochau: Šachov
Klein Umlowitz: Omlenička, p. of Omlenice
Klein Uretschlag: Dvořetín
Klein Wallstein: Kraví Hora
Klein Wanau: Vaňov
Klein Wehlen: Malá Velen
Klein Werscheditz: Verušičky
Klein Wöhlen (Klein Wehlen): Malá Veleň
Klein Wonetitz: Bonětičky, p. of Stráž (Tachov District)
Klein Würben: Malé Vrbno
Klein Zdikau: Branišov
Klein Zdikau: Zdíkovec, p. of Zdíkov
Klein Ziegenruck: Malý Kozí Hřbet, p. of Rejštejn
Klein Zmietsch: Smědeček, p. of Ktiš
Kleische: Klíše, p. of Ústí nad Labem
Klemensdorf:
Klimentov, p. of Velká Hleďsebe
Lasvice, p. of Zákupy
Klenowitz:
Klenovice
Klenovice, p. of Mičovice
Klenovice, p. of Milešov
Klenovice, p. of Všeruby (Plzeň-North District)
Klenovice na Hané
Klentnitz: Klentnice
Klentsch: Klenčí pod Čerchovem
Kleppel: Klepáčov, p. of Sobotín
Kleppen: Klepná
Kletten: Kletné, p. of Suchdol nad Odrou
Klingen: Hlínová
Klingenberg: Zvíkov
Klinghart: Křižovatka
Klistau: Chlistov
Klitschney: Klíčnov, p. of Pulečný
Klobauk (Klobouk): Klobouky u Brna
Kloben: Hlavno, p. of Citice
Klobuk: Klobuky
Klomin: Chlumín
Kloppe: Klopina
Kloster:
Klášter, p. of Nová Bystřice
(an der Iser): Klášter Hradiště nad Jizerou
Klösterle:
Klášterec, p. of Olšany (Šumperk District)
Klášterec, p. of Vimperk
(an der Eger): Klášterec nad Ohří
Klášterec nad Orlicí
Klosterdorf: Černé Budy
Klostergrab: Hrob
Klostermühle: Klášterský Mlýn, p. of Rejštejn
Kloster Radisch: Klášterní Hradisko, p. of Olomouc
Klum:
Chlum (Česká Lípa District)
Chlum, p. of Pšov
Klumtschan: Petrohrad
Klutschenitz: Klučenice
Klutschkau: Kluček, p. of Liběšice (Louny District)
Knezic (Kniezitz): Kněžice (Chrudim District)
Kniebitschken: Pňovičky, p. of Ohníč
Knieschitz: Kněžice (Jihlava District)
Knihnitz: Knínice (Blansko District)
Kninitz: Knínice, p. of Libouchec
Knöba: Hněvín
Knönitz: Knínice, p. of Žlutice
Knöschitz: Kněžice, p. of Podbořany
Kobels (Kobilly, Kobylli): Kobylí
Koberwald: Koberovy
Köberwitz: Kobeřice
Kobilla (Kobyla): Kobylé, p. of Pšov
Köblau: Keblov
Koblau: Koblov, p. of Ostrava
Kochet: Kochanov
Kocourow: Kocourov
Köderhof: Denkův Dvůr
Kodetschlag: Jenín, p. of Dolní Dvořiště
Kofel: Kobelec
Köhlersdorf: Uhlířov
Kohlgruben: Jámy
Kohlhau (Kohlau): Kolová
Kohlheim: Uhliště
Kohlige: Uhelná, p. of Hrádek nad Nisou
Kohling: Milíře, now Šindelová (e)
Kohljanowitz: Uhlířské Janovice
Kohl Pribrams (Kohlpribram): Uhelná Příbram
Kohlsdorf: Kolnovice, p. of Mikulovice (Jeseník District)
Kohlstatt (Kohlstadt): Milíře, p. of Rádlo
Kohlstätten: Šnory, now Pelechy (e)
Köhmet: Komňátka, p. of Bohdíkov
Kojatek: Kojátky
Kojetein:
Kojetín (Havlíčkův Brod District)
Kojetín (Přerov District)
Kojetín, p. of Nový Jičín
Kojetitz:
Kojetice (Mělník District)
Kojetice (Třebíč District)
Kojetice, p. of Ústí nad Labem
Kojetín, p. of Radonice (Chomutov District)
Kokaschitz: Kokašice
Koken: Kohoutov
Kokor: Kokory
Kokorow: Kokorov
Koleschowitz: Kolešovice
Koletsch: Koleč
Kolin (Köln an der Elbe): Kolín
Kolinetz (Kollinetz): Kolinec
Kollautschen: Koloveč
Köllein: Cholina
Kolleschau: Kolešov, p. of Pšov
Kolleschau: Kolšov
Kolleschowitz (Koleschowitz): Kolešovice
Köllne: Včelná pod Boubínem, p. of Buk (Prachatice District)
Kolloredau: Koloredov
Kolmberg: Plešivec, now Volary
Kolosoruk (Kollosoruk): Korozluky
Kolmen: Děčín XXXIV-Chlum
Komarschitz: Komařice
Komein: Brno-Komín
Komeise: Chomýž, now Krnov
Kommern: Komořany, p. of Most
Komoran: Prague 12-Komořany
Komorau:
Komárov (Beroun District)
Komárov, p. of Opava
Komotau:
Chomoutov, p. of Olomouc
Chomutov
Konakow: Koňákov, p. of Český Těšín
Konarowitz: Konárovice
Konetzchlum: Konecchlumí
Königgrätz: Hradec Králové
Königinhof an der Elbe: Dvůr Králové nad Labem
Königliche Weinberge: Prague-Vinohrady
Königreich Drei: Dolní Nemojov
Königreich Zwei: Hájemství
Königsaal: Prague-Zbraslav
Königsberg:
Klimkovice
(an der Eger): Kynšperk nad Ohří
Königseck: Kunžak
Königsfeld:
Anenská Studánka
Brno-Královo Pole
Königsfeld Waschan: Královopolské Vážany, p. of Rousínov
Königsgrund: Králec, p. of Dolní Studénky
Königshain: Královka, p. of Šluknov
Königshan (Königshann): Královec
Königshof: Králův Dvůr
Königstadtl: Městec Králové
Königswald: Libouchec
Königswalde: Království, p. of Šluknov
Königswart: Lázně Kynžvart
Königswerth: Královské Poříčí
Konin: Konín, p. of Velhartice
Konitz: Konice
Konkolna: Koukolná, p. of Dětmarovice
Konojed: Konojedy, p. of Úštěk
Konopischt: Konopiště
Konraditz:
Kundratice
Kundratice, p. of Přimda
Konrads: Klášter
Konradsgrün: Salajna, p. of Dolní Žandov
Konstadt: Mlýnská, p. of Kraslice
Konstantinsbad: Konstantinovy Lázně
Kopain:
Kopanina, p. of Pulečný
Kopaniny, p. of Chvalkovice (Náchod District)
Köppeln: Keply, p. of Hartmanice (Klatovy District)
Kopetzen: Kopec, p. of Prostiboř
Kopidlno (Kopidlelau): Kopidlno
Kopitz (Kopist): Kopisty, now Most
Koppertsch: Koporeč, p. of Lišnice
Koralkow: Koralkov
Körbern: Prague-Košíře
Körbitz: Krbice
Koritschan: Koryčany
Korkonosch: Krkonoš
Korkushütten: Korkusova Huť, p. of Vimperk
Kornau: Obilná, p. of Odrava
Kornhaus: Mšec
Kornitz: Chornice
Kornsalz: Prostřední Krušec
Koschatka: Košatka, p. of Stará Ves nad Ondřejnicí
Koschendorf: Košetice, p. of Velké Heraltice
Koschetitz (Koschen): Košetice
Koschir: Prague-Košíře
Koschowitz: Kojšovice, p. of Toužim
Kosel: Kozly (Česká Lípa District)
Koslau:
Kozlov (Jihlava District)
(Kozlau): Kozlov (Olomouc District)
Koslike: Kozlíky, p. of Rtyně nad Bílinou
Kosmacow: Kosmacov
Kosmanos: Kosmonosy
Kosmütz: Kozmice (Opava District)
Kosolup: Horní Kozolupy
Kosow: Kozov, p. of Bouzov
Kosse: Kosov (Šumperk District)
Kosslau (Koslau):
Kozlov (Žďár nad Sázavou District)
Kozlov, p. of Bochov
Kostel (Kostl): Podivín
Kösteldorf: Rajec
Kosteletz
Červený Kostelec
(an der Moldau): Kostelec nad Vltavou
(bei Holleschau): Kostelec u Holešova
(in der Hanna): Kostelec na Hané
Kostelzen: Kostelec (Tachov District)
Kosten: Košťany
Kosten: Koštov, p. of Trmice
Kostenblatt: Kostomlaty pod Milešovkou
Kosterschan: Kostrčany, p. of Valeč (Karlovy Vary District)
Kostomlat unterm Georgsberg: Kostomlaty pod Řípem
Kotieschau (Kotieschow): Chotěšov, p. of Velhartice
Kotigau: Chotíkov, p. of Kynšperk nad Ohří
Kötschwitz: Chocovice, p. of Třebeň
Kottiken: Chotíkov
Köttnitz: Skotnice
Kottomirsch: Chotiměř
Kottowitz: Kotovice
Kottwitz: Chotěvice
Kotzehrad (Kotzerad, Kozehrad): Chocerady
Kotzendorf: Moravskoslezský Kočov
Kotzianau: Kociánov, p. of Loučná nad Desnou
Kotzobendz: Chotěbuz
Kotzoura: Kocourov
Kowarschow: Kovářov
Kowarschen: Kovářov, p. of Čichalov
Kozlan (Koschlan): Kožlany
Kozuschan: Kožušany, p. of Kožušany-Tážaly
Kradrob: Kladruby (Teplice District)
Krainhof: Dvorečky, p. of Kynšperk nad Ohří
Kralik: Králíky (Hradec Králové District)
Kralitz:
(in der Hanna): Kralice na Hané
Kralice nad Oslavou
Krallen: Kralovice, p. of Nebahovy
Kralowitz: Kralovice
Kralup an der Moldau: Kralupy nad Vltavou
Kramitz: Chrámce, p. of Skršín
Krasch: Krašov, p. of Bezvěrov
Kraschowitz: Krašovice
Krasensko: Krásensko
Krasna: Krásno nad Bečvou, p. of Valašské Meziříčí
Krasnahora: Krásná Hora
Krassetin: Krasetín, p. of Holubov
Krassonitz: Krasonice
Kratenau: Kratonohy
Kratzau: Chrastava
Kratzdorf: Chrastice, p. of Staré Město (Šumperk District)
Krawska: Kravsko
Kreibitz: Chřibská
Kreibitz-Neudörfel: Rybniště
Krelowitz: Křelovice (Pelhřimov District)
Kremetschau: Křemačov, p. of Mohelnice
Krems: Křemže
Kremsier: Kroměříž
Kremusch (Krzemusch): Křemýž, p. of Ohníč
Krenau: Křenov, p. of Kájov
Krenschowitz (Krenschwitz): Chrancovice
Kreppenschläger: Křeplice, now Prachatice
Kresane: Křesanov, p. of Vimperk
Kreschtowitz: Chřešťovice, p. of Albrechtice nad Vltavou
Kretin: see Krzetin
Kretscham: Krčma, now Domašín
Kreuz-Kosteletz: Kostelec u Křížků
Kreuzberg:
Krucemburk
Kružberk
Kreuzendorf: Holasovice
Kreuzenstein: Podhoří, p. of Cheb
Kreuzweg: Křížatky, p. of Litvínov
Kriebaum: Vitěšovice, now Boletice MTA (e)
Kriebaumkollern: Vitěšovičtí Uhlíři, now Boletice MTA (e)
Krieblitz: Kryblice, p. of Trutnov
Kriegern: Kryry
Kriegsdorf: Valšov
Kriesdorf: Křižany
Kriesenitz: Kříženec, p. of Hartmanice (Klatovy District)
Krinsdorf:
Křenov, p. of Bernartice (Trutnov District)
Křižanov, p. of Hrob
Krima: Křimov
Krimitz (Krzimitz): Křimice, p. of Plzeň
Krinetz: Křinec
Krippau: Skřipová, p. of Vrbice (Karlovy Vary District)
Krips: Křivce, p. of Bezdružice
Krisch (Krzisch): Kříše, p. of Břasy
Krischek: Křížky, p. of Malá Skála
Krischwitz: Děčín XXXI-Křešice
Krisenitz: Kříženec
Krisowitz: Křížovice
Kritschen: Podolí (Brno-Country District)
Krisaudow (Kschiwsoudow): Křivsoudov
Krizanau (Krzizanau, Krischanau): Křižanov (Žďár nad Sázavou District)
Krizinkau (Krischinkow): Křižínkov
Krizlitz: Křížlice, p. of Jestřabí v Krkonoších
Krochwitz: Děčín VII-Chrochvice
Krokersdorf: Krakořice, p. of Šternberk
Krombach: Krompach
Kröna: Křenová
Krönau: Křelov, p. of Křelov-Břuchotín
Krondorf: Korunní, p. of Stráž nad Ohří
Krondorf-Sauerbrunn: Korunní Kyselka
Kronland: Lanškroun
Kronsdorf: Krasov
Kronstadt: Kunštát, now Orlické Záhoří
Kropfetschlag: Klopanov
Kropfschlag: Mýtiny, now Nové Hrady (České Budějovice District) (e)
Kropitz: Krapice, p. of Františkovy Lázně
Kropsdorf: Zábraní, now Malšín (e)
Krotiv: Krotějov
Krottensee: Mokřina, p. of Milíkov (Cheb District)
Krauna: Krouna
Krautenwalde: Travná, p. of Javorník (Jeseník District)
Kruch: Kruh
Krugsreuth: Kopaniny, p. of Aš
Krumau (Krummau, Krumau an der Moldau): Český Krumlov
Krummwasser: Křivá Voda, p. of Malá Morava
Krumpisch: Chromeč
Kruschowitz: Krušovice
Krzenowitz (Krenowitz):
Křenovice (Přerov District)
Křenovice (Vyškov District)
Krzetin: Křetín
Krzy: see Girsch
Krzeschitz: Křešice
Kschakau (Krakau): Křakov, p. of Mířkov
Kschellowitz (Krellowitz): Křelovice (Plzeň-North District)
Kscheutz: Kšice
Kschiha: Číhaná, p. of Teplá
Ktowa: Ktová
Kubitzen: Česká Kubice
Kublow (Kublau): Kublov
Kubohütten: Kubova Huť
Kuchelna: Chuchelná
Kühberg: Chřepice, p. of Čachrov
Künast: Sosnová (Česká Lípa District)
Kührberg: Mezihorská
Kukan: Kokonín, p. of Jablonec nad Nisou
Kuklen: Kukleny, p. of Hradec Králové
Kukus: Kuks
Kulm: Chlumec (Ústí nad Labem District)
Kulsam: Odrava
Kumerau: Komárov, p. of Toužim
Kummer: Hradčany, p. of Ralsko
Kummerpursch: Konobrže
Kumrowitz: Brno-Komárov
Kundratitz:
Kundratice
Kundratice, p. of Hartmanice (Klatovy District)
Kunewald: Kunín
Kuniowitz: Kunějovice
Kunkowitz:
Kunkovice
Kunkovice, p. of Čachrov
Kunnersdorf:
Kunratice (Děčín District)
Kunratice (Liberec District)
Kunratice u Cvikova
Liberec XXIX-Kunratice
Kunratice, p. of Šluknov
Kunowitz:
Kunovice (Uherské Hradiště District)
Kunovice (Vsetín District)
Kunstadt: Kunštát
Kunwald (Kunewalde): Kunvald
Kunzendorf:
Dolejší Kunčice, p. of Fulnek
Kunčice, p. of Letohrad
Kunčice, p. of Staré Město (Šumperk District)
Kunčice pod Ondřejníkem
Kunčina
Kupferberg: Měděnec
Kurschin: Kořen, p. of Olbramov
Kuschwarda: Strážný
Kutsch: Chudeč, p. of Bezvěrov
Kutscherau: Kučerov
Kutschlin: Kučlín, p. of Hrobčice
Kuttelberg: Spálené, p. of Holčovice
Kuttenberg: Kutná Hora
Kuttendorf: Chotiněves
Kuttenplan: Chodová Planá
Kuttenplaner Schmelzthal: Chodovská Huť, p. of Tři Sekery
Kuttenschloß: Trhanov
Kuttenthal: Chotětov
Kutterschitz:
Chudeřice
Chudeřice, p. of Bílina
Kuttnau: Chotěnov
Kuttowanka: Chotovenka
Kuttowitz: Chotějovice, p. of Světec
Kwasney (Kwasin): Kvasiny
Kwassitz: Kvasice
Kwetow: Květov
Kwietoschin: Květušov, p. of Polná na Šumavě
Kwitkau: Kvítkov, p. of Modlany
Kwittein: Květín, p. of Mohelnice
Kwon: Chbany
Kyowitz (Kiowitz): Kyjovice (Opava District)

L

Laab: Labe, p. of Malá Skála
Laaden: Lada v Podještědí, p. of Jablonné v Podještědí
Laas: Láz (Příbram District)
Labant: Labuť
Labau: Huť, p. of Pěnčín (Jablonec nad Nisou District)
Labes: Lobzy
Lachenwitz: Lachovice, p. of Vyšší Brod
Lachowitz: Lachovice, p. of Toužim
Ladowitz: Ledvice
Ladung:
Lesná, p. of Nová Ves v Horách
Loučná, p. of Lom (Most District)
Lämberg: Lvová, p. of Jablonné v Podještědí
Lagau: Slavkov, p. of Bohdalovice
Lahowitz: Lahovice
Lahrenbochen: Mlýnec, now Vyšší Brod (e)
Laittau (Laitter): Rebrí
Lainsitz: Lužnice (river)
Lakowitz: Slavíkovice, p. of Rousínov
Lammeldorf: Jehnědí
Lampersdorf: Lampertice
Lana (Lahna, Lahn): Lány (Kladno District)
Landek: Otročín
Landschau über Frain: Lančov
Landshut in Mähren: Lanžhot
Landskron: Lanškroun
Landstein: Landštejn, p. of Staré Město pod Landštejnem
Landstrassen: Silnice
Lang Lammitz (Langlamnitz): Dlouhá Lomnice, p. of Bochov
Lang Lhotta: Dlouhá Lhota (Blansko District)
Langstrobnitz: Dlouhá Stropnice, p. of Horní Stropnice
Lang Ugest: Jenišuv Újezd
Langenau:
Dlouhý Luh, now Hradiště MTA (e)
Lánov
Skalice u České Lípy
Langenberg: Dlouhá Stráň
Langenbruck:
Dlouhé Mosty, p. of Františkovy Lázně
Dlouhý Most
Olšina, parts of Horní Planá and Polná na Šumavě
Langendörflas: Dlouhý Újezd
Langendorf:
Dlouhá Loučka (Olomouc District)
Dlouhá Ves (Havlíčkův Brod District)
Dlouhá Ves (Klatovy District)
Dlouhá Ves, p. of Holčovice
Dlouhá Ves, p. of Vrchoslavice
Langengrund: Dlouhý Důl, p. of Krásná Lípa
Langenhauer Hegerhaus:
Langenlutsch: Dlouhá Loučka (Svitavy District)
Langentriebe: Dlouhá Třebová
Langewiese: Dlouhá Louka, p. of Osek (Teplice District)
Langgrün: Bystřice, p. of Hroznětín
Langhaid: Dlouhý Bor, p. of Nová Pec
Lang-Pirnitz (Langpirnitz): Dlouhá Brtnice M,10
Langwasser: Dlouhá Voda, p. of Město Albrechtice
Langwiesen:
Dlouhá Louka, p. of Lípa nad Orlicí
Dlouhá Louka, p. of Lužany (Plzeň-South District)
Lanz: Lomnice (Sokolov District)
Lapitzfeld: Lipoltov, p. of Tuřany (Cheb District)
Larischau: Láryšov, p. of Býkov-Láryšov
Laschan (Lazan):
Lažany (Blansko District)
Lažany (Liberec District)
Lažany (Strakonice District)
Laschan Desfours: Defurovy Lažany, p. of Chanovice
Laschin: Lažany, p. of Štědrá
Laschkau: Laškov
Laschkles: Blažkov, p. of Omlenice
Laske: Lazce, p. of Olomouc
Latron: Latrán, p. of Český Krumlov
Laube: Děčín XIII-Loubí
Laubendorf: Limberk
Laubias: Lubojaty, p. of Bílovec
Laucha: Louchov
Laudmer: Luboměř
Lauka: Louka, p. of Jemnice
Laun: Louny
Launitz: Lounice, p. of Litvínov
Launowitz (Launiowitz): Louňovice B,3
Lausitzer Neiße: Lužická Nisa (river)
Lauterbach:
Čirá, p. of Kraslice
Čistá (Svitavy District)
Čistá, now Rovná (Sokolov District) (e)
Potůčník, p. of Hanušovice
Lautersdorf: Čistěves
Lauterseifen: Pustá Rudná, p. of Andělská Hora (Bruntál District)
Lauterwasser: Čistá v Krkonoších, p. of Černý Důl
Lautsch:
Loučky, p. of Odry
Mladeč
Lautsche: Loučná, p. of Višňová (Liberec District)
Lautschim: Loučim
Lautschin: Loučeň
Lautschnei: Loučná nad Nisou, p. of Janov nad Nisou
Lauxmühle: Výsada, p. of Vejprty
Lazan:
Lažany (Blansko District)
Lažany (Liberec District)
Lažany (Strakonice District)
Lazy: Lazy, p. of Orlová
Lechwitz: Lechovice
Ledau (Leedau): Letov, p. of Podbořany
Ledenitz: Ledenice
Ledetsch (an der Sasau): Ledeč nad Sázavou
Lehen: Léno
Leibitsch: Liboc, p. of Kynšperk nad Ohří
Leickow: Lejčkov, p. of Dolní Hořice
Leierwinkel: Háje, p. of Lesná (Tachov District)
Leimgruben: Hlinky, p. of Stanovice (Karlovy Vary District)
Leimsgrub: Hliništĕ, p. of Strážný
Leinbaum: Klenová, p. of Nová Bystřice
Leipertitz: Litobratřice
Leipnik (Leibnik): Lipník nad Bečvou
Leiter: Řebří, p. of Svojšín
Leitersdorf: Litultovice
Leitmeritz: Litoměřice
Leitnowitz: Litvínovice
Leitomischl: Litomyšl
Lellowa: Lelov, p. of Žalany
Leneschitz: Lenešice
Lenzdorf: Mlýnice, p. of Červená Voda (Ústí nad Orlicí District)
Leopoldsdorf: Leopoldov
Leopoldshammer: Leopoldovy Hamry
Leopoldsruh: Leopoldka, p. of Velký Šenov
Lerchenhof: Skřivánek, p. of Okrouhlička
Lesche: Leština (Šumperk District)
Leschowitz: Lechovice
Leschtina: Leština (Ústí nad Orlicí District)
Leschtine: Leština, p. of Malé Březno (Ústí nad Labem District)
Leskau:
Brno-Starý Lískovec
Lestkov (Tachov District)
Leskenthal: Vítkov, p. of Česká Lípa
Leskowetz: Lískovec, p. of Frýdek-Místek
Lesna: Brno-Lesná
Lesnitz: Lesnice
Lessau: Lesov, p. of Sadov
Lettin: Letiny
Lettowitz: Letovice
Leukersdorf: Čermná, p. of Libouchec
Lewanitz: Levonice, p. of Postoloprty
Lewin: Levín
Lexen: Líšnice (Šumperk District)
Lhota unter Liebtschan: Lhota pod Libčany
Lhotka: Městská Lhotka, p. of Prachatice
Liban: Libáň
Libein: Libivá, p. of Mohelnice
Libejitz: Libějice
Libetin: Libentiny, p. of Líšný
Libesnitz: Líbeznice
Libin: Libyně, p. of Lubenec
Libisch: Libiš
Libitz:
(an der Zidlina): Libice nad Cidlinou
Libice nad Doubravou
Liblin: Liblín
Liblitz (Lieblitz): Liblice
Liboch: Liběchov
Libochowan: Libochovany
Libochowitz: Libochovice
Liboritz: Libořice
Liboschan: Libočany
Libotin: Libotyně, p. of Radhostice
Libotz: Prague-Liboc
Libschitz an der Moldau: Libčice nad Vltavou
Libusin: Libušín
Lichnau: Lichnov (Nový Jičín District)
Lichten: Lichnov (Bruntál District)
Lichtenau: Lichkov
Lichtenberg: Světlík, p. of Horní Podluží
Lichtenhain:
Světliny 1.díl, p. of Varnsdorf
Světliny 2.díl, p. of Dolní Podluží
Lichtenstadt: Hroznětín
Lichtenstein:
Ladečka, p. of Horní Podluží
Líšťany (Plzeň-North District)
Lichtewerden: Světlá, p. of Světlá Hora
Liditz: Lidice
Liditzau (Lititzau): Liticov, p. of Ostrov (Karlovy Vary District)
Liebau: Libina
Liebauthal: Libavské Údolí
Lieben:
Prague-Libeň
Libov, p. of Chuderov
Liebenau:
Hodkovice nad Mohelkou
Libnov, p. of Krajková
Liebenstein: Libá
Liebenthal:
Dolní Dobrouč
Liptaň
Luboměř pod Strážnou
Liebeschitz (Libeschitz):
Liběšice (Litoměřice District)
Liběšice (Louny District)
Liebesdorf:
Hněvanov, p. of Rožmitál na Šumavě
Obědné, p. of Libina
Liebeswar: Libosváry, p. of Vidice (Domažlice District)
Liebinsdorf (Libinsdorf): Karlov (Žďár nad Sázavou District)
Liebisch: Libhošť
Lieboritz: Libořice
Liebotschan: Libočany
Liebshausen: Libčeves
Liebstadtl: Libštát
Liebtschan (Libcan): Libčany
Liedlhöfen: Lídlovy Dvory, p. of Kašperské Hory
Liehn: Líně
Liesdorf: Liboňov, p. of Telnice (Ústí nad Labem District)
Liessnitz: Lysec, p. of Bžany (Teplice District)
Lieschwitz: Libešovice
Lihn: Hlinné, p. of Tisová (Tachov District)
Liliendorf: Lesná (Znojmo District)
Limpach: Lipnice, p. of Kunratice (Děčín District)
Lindau: Lipná, p. of Hazlov
Linden:
Linda, now Přední Výtoň (e)
Lípa (Havlíčkův Brod District)
Machnatec, now Rožmberk nad Vltavou
Lindenau:
Lindava, p. of Cvikov
Lipná, p. of Potštát
Lindenhau: Lipová (Cheb District)
Lindewiese: Lipová-Lázně
Lindig: Lípa, p. of Merklín (Karlovy Vary District)
Lindles: Mlynany
Lindner Waldhäuser: Lindské Chalupy, now Přední Výtoň (e)
Lingau: Nynkov, p. of Svojšín
Linschen: Hlince, p. of Kostomlaty pod Milešovkou
Linsdorf: Těchonín
Lintsch: Hlinec, p. of Bochov
Linz: Mlýnec
Lipkau: Libkov (Domažlice District)
Lipkowawoda (Libekswasser): Libkova Voda
Lipnik:
Lipník (Mladá Boleslav District)
Lipník (Třebíč District)
Lipnitz (an der Sasau): Lipnice nad Sázavou
Lipolz: Lipolec, p. of Dačice
Lippen: Lipno nad Vltavou
Lippin: Lipina, p. of Štáblovice
Lippowetz: Lipovec (Blansko District)
Lipthal: Liptál
Liquitz: Libkovice, p. of Mariánské Radčice (e)
Lischan: Lišany (Louny District)
Lischau: Lišov
Lischin: Líšina
Lischnei: Líšný
Lischnitz: Lišnice
Lischtian: Líšťany (Louny District)
Lischwitz: Libešovice
Lisek: Lísek
Liskowetz: Lískovec
Lispitz: Blížkovice
Lissa an der Elbe: Lysá nad Labem
Lissitz: Lysice
Lissowa: Lisov
Lissowitz: Lysovice
Litentschitz (Littentschitz, Litenschitz): Litenčice
Lititz: Litice nad Orlicí
Litschau: Ličov, p. of Benešov nad Černou
Litschkau: Líčkov, p. of Liběšice (Louny District)
Litschnitz: Ličenice, p. of Úštěk
Littau: Litovel
Litten: Liteň
Littengrün: Lítov, p. of Habartov
Littitsch: Litíč
Littitz an der Adler: Litice nad Orlicí, p. of Záchlumí (Ústí nad Orlicí District)
Littmitz: Lipnice, now Vintířov (e)
Lobeditz: Zlovědice, p. of Krásný Dvůr
Lobendau: Lobendava
Lobenstein: Úvalno
Lobes: Lobeč
Lobeskirchen: Horní Cerekev
Lobiesching, Gemeinde: Lověšice
Lobieschinger Ruben, zu Lobiesching: Lovesicke Rovne
Lobnig: Lomnice (Bruntál District)
Lobositz: Lovosice
Lobs: Lobzy, p. of Březová (Sokolov District)
Loch: Dolina, p. of Krajková
Lochowitz: Lochovice
Lochutzen: Lochousice
Lodenitz:
Loděnice (Beroun District)
Loděnice (Brno-Country District)
Loděnice, p. of Holasovice
Lodus: Mladoňov, now Dolní Dvořiště (e)
Lohof: Luhov, p. of Toužim
Lösch: Brno-Líšeň
Löschna: Lešná
Lohhäuser: Slatina
Lohm bei Weseritz: Lomy
Lohm bei Mies: Lom u Stříbra, p. of Benešovice
Lohm bei Tachau: Lom u Tachova
Lometz: Lomec
Lomigsdorf: Dlouhomilov
Lomnitschka: Lomnička (Brno-Country District)
Lomnitz:
Lomnice (Brno-Country District)
(an der Lainsitz): Lomnice nad Lužnicí
(an der Popelka): Lomnice nad Popelkou
Loosch: Lahošť
Loosdorf (Losdorf): Ludvíkovice
Lopatne, zu Wullachen: Lopatne
Losau: Lažany
Loschau: Lošov, p. of Olomouc
Loschitz: Loštice
Losnitz: Lazec, p. of Kájov
Lossin: Losiná
Lotschenitz: Ločenice
Loucky: Sekerkovy Loucky
Louschnitz (Louznitz): Loužnice
Lowtschitz, Lowčitz: Lovcice
Lsten: Lštění
Lub: Luby, p. of Chyše
Lubens (Lubenz): Lubenec
Lubokey: Liberec XXVIII-Hluboká
Luck:
Luka, p. of Verušičky
Lukavec, p. of Fulnek
Ludgierzowitz (Ludgerstal): Ludgeřovice
Ludikau: Ludíkov
Luditz: Žlutice
Ludwigsberg: Ludvické Hory
Ludwigsthal:
Ludvíkov
Ludvíkov, p. of Velké Losiny
Luggau: Lukov u Znojma
Luhatschowitz: Luhačovice
Luh: Luhov, p. of Brniště
Luk: Luká
Luka: Lukov, p. of Úštěk
Lukau:
Hlávkov, p. of Vyskytná nad Jihlavou
Loučová, p. of Hartmanice (Klatovy District)
Lukawetz (Lukawitz):
Lukavec (Pelhřimov District)
Lukavice (Šumperk District)
Lukavec, p. of Bor (Tachov District)
Luken: Luka (Česká Lípa District)
Lukow: Lukov (Teplice District)
Lukowa: Luková, p. of Brodek u Přerova
Lultsch: Luleč
Lundenburg: Břeclav
Lupelle: Lupěné, p. of Nemile
Lupenz: Slupenec, p. of Český Krumlov
Luppetsching: Slupečná, p. of Lipno nad Vltavou
Lusading: Služetín, p. of Teplá
Luschan:
Lužany (Hradec Králové District)
Lužany (Plzeň-South District)
Lusche: Luže (Chrudim District)
Luschetz an der Moldau: Lužec nad Vltavou
Luschitz:
Lužice (Hodonín District)
Lužice (Most District)
Luschtienitz (Lustenitz): Luštěnice
Luschna: Lužná (Rakovník District)
Luschne: Lužná, p. of Větřní
Luschnitz: Lužnice, p. of Pohorská Ves
Lusdorf an der Tafelfichte: Ludvíkov pod Smrkem, p. of Nové Město pod Smrkem
Lusen: Lužná, p. of Bor (Tachov District)
Lusetin: Služetín, p. of Bezvěrov
Lutschau: Loučej, p. of Křemže
Lutschen: Loučky, p. of Vílanec
Lutschkahäuseln: Loučky
Luxdorf: Lukášov, p. of Jablonec nad Nisou
Luzan:
Lužany (Hradec Králové District)
Lužany (Jičín District)

M

Machau: Machov
Machendorf: Liberec XXXIII-Machnín
Machowitz: Machovice, p. of Pertoltice (Kutná Hora District)
Mader: Modrava
Maffersdorf: Liberec XXX-Vratislavice nad Nisou
Mähren: Morava
Mährisch Altstadt: Staré Město (Šumperk District)
Mährisch Aussee: Úsov
Mährisch Budwitz: Moravské Budějovice
Mährisch Chrostau: Moravská Chrastová, p. of Brněnec
Mährisch Hause: Moravská Huzová, p. of Štěpánov
Mährisch Karlsdorf: Moravský Karlov, p. of Červená Voda (Ústí nad Orlicí District)
Mährisch Kotzendorf: Moravský Kočov, p. of Moravskoslezský Kočov
Mährisch Kromau: Moravský Krumlov
Mährisch Lotschnau: Lačnov, p. of Svitavy
Mährisch Neudorf: Moravská Nová Ves
Mährisch Neustadt: Uničov
Mährisch Ostrau: Moravská Ostrava, p. of Ostrava
Mährisch Pisek: Moravský Písek
Mährisch Pruß (Mährisch Preußen): Moravské Prusy, p. of Prusy-Boškůvky
Mährisch Rothwasser: Červená Voda (Ústí nad Orlicí District)
Mährisch Schönberg: Šumperk
Mährisch Trübau: Moravská Třebová
Mährisch und Schlesisch Kotzendorf: Moravskoslezský Kočov
Mährisch Weißkirchen: Hranice (Přerov District)
Mährisch Wiesen: Moravská Dlouhá, now Březová nad Svitavou
Maidelberg: Dívčí Hrad
Maierhof: Humenice, p. of Horní Stropnice
Maierhöfen: Dvory, now Bukovany (Sokolov District) (e)
Maiersgrün: Vysoká, p. of Stará Voda (Cheb District)
Maiwald: Májůvka, p. of Bílčice
Malec: Maleč
Malenitz: Malenice
Malenowitz: Malenovice
Maleschitz: Malesice, p. of Dříteň
Malesitz:
Malesice, p. of Plzeň
Prague-Malešice
Maleschau: Malešov
Malhostitz: Malhostice, p. of Rtyně nad Bílinou
Malkau: Málkov (Chomutov District)
Malkowitz: Málkovice, p. of Bor (Tachov District)
Mallinetz: Malinec
Mallowitz: Malovice, p. of Bor (Tachov District)
Malnitz: Malnice, p. of Postoloprty
Malonitz: Malonice, p. of Blížejov
Malotitz: Malotice
Maloweska: Malá Víska
Malschen: Malečov
Malsching: Malšín
Malschitz: Malšice
Malschwitz: Malšovice
Malspitz: Malešovice
Maltheuern: Záluží, p. of Litvínov
Maltsch: Malše (river)
Maltsche: Malče, p. of Besednice
Maltschitz: Malčice, p. of Mirkovice
Manetin: Manětín
Manisch: Manušice, p. of Česká Lípa
Mankendorf: Mankovice
Mansdorf: Jedvaniny
Mantau: Mantov
March: Morava (river)
Margarethendorf: Marketa, p. of Dolní Poustevna
Maria Kulm: Chlum Svaté Máří
Maria Ratschitz: Mariánské Radčice
Maria Schnee: U Svatého Kamene, now Dolní Dvořiště
Maria Teinitz: Mariánský Týnec
Mariafels: Slavice
Mariaschein: Bohosudov, p. of Krupka
Mariasorg: Mariánská, p. of Jáchymov
Mariastock: Skoky, p. of Žlutice
Marienbad: Mariánské Lázně
Marienberg:
Mariánské Hory, p. of Ostrava
Mariánská Hora, p. of Albrechtice v Jizerských horách
Marienthal:
Mariánské Údolí, p. of Hlubočky
Mariánské Údolí, p. of Horní Jiřetín
Markhausen:
Hraničná, p. of Kraslice
Pomezná, now Libá (e)
Markausch: Markoušovice, p. of Velké Svatoňovice
Markersdorf:
Markvartice (Děčín District)
Markvartice, p. of Jablonné v Podještědí
Nová Hradečná
Markvartovice
Markersdorf am Jeschken: Markvartice pod Ještedem
Markl: Pomezí, p. of Staré Město pod Landštejnem
Markscheid: Rozdelov
Markt Bürglitz: Velký Vřešťov
Markt Eisenstein: Železná Ruda
Markt Frain: Vratenov
Markt Janowitz: Vrchotovy Janovice
Markt Joslowitz: Jaroslavice
Markt Kamnitz: Trhová Kamenice
Markt Roßwald: Slezské Rudoltice
Markt Schurz: Žireč Městys
Markt Stankau: Staňkov I, p. of Staňkov (Domažlice District)
Markt Stiepanau: Trhový Štěpánov
Markt Türnau: Městečko Trnávka
Markus zu Krizowitz: Markov or Marky
Markusgrün: Podlesí, p. of Dolní Žandov
Markwarding: Markvarec
Markwartitz: Markvartice, p. of Zubčice
Marletzgrün: Maroltov, p. of Ostrov (Karlovy Vary District)
Maroditz: Martice, now Bochov (e)
Marschen: Maršov, p. of Krupka
Marschendorf:
Horní Maršov
Maršíkov, p. of Velké Losiny
Marschow (Marschau): Maršov
Marschowitz: Maršovice (Jablonec nad Nisou District)
Martetschlag: Martínkov
Martinau: Martinov, p. of Ostrava
Martinitz: Martinice v Krkonoších
Martnau: Martinov, p. of Vlkovice
Märzdorf: Martínkovice
Maschakotten: Maršovy Chody, p. of Částkov (Tachov District)
Maschau: Mašťov
Maßhaupt: Kročehlavy, p. of Kladno
Mastig: Mostek (Trutnov District)
Mastirowitz: Mastířovice, p. of Vrbice (Litoměřice District)
Mastung: Mostec, p. of Štědrá
Matschitz: Mačice
Matschowitz: Mačovice
Matzdorf: Matějovice, p. of Rusín
Mauth: Mýto
Mauthaus: Mýtnice, now Nemanice (e)
Mauthdorf: Mýto, p. of Tachov
Mauthstadt: Mýto, p. of Hořice na Šumavě
Maxberg: Maxov, p. of Všeruby (Domažlice District)
Maxdorf:
Děčín XVIII-Maxičky
Maxov, p. of Radvanec
Mayerbach: Dolní Borková
Mazocha: Macocha
Medleschitz: Medlešice, p. of Chrudim
Medlitz: Medlice
Meedel (Meedl): Medlov (Olomouc District)
Meeden: Medná, p. of Srby (Domažlice District)
Mehlhiedl: Lhotka, p. of Křemže
Mehlhüttel: Masákova Lhota, p. of Zdíkov
Mehregarten: Zahrádky, p. of Borová Lada
Meierhöfen: Dvory, p. of Karlovy Vary
Meigelshof: Chodov (Domažlice District)
Meinetschlag: Malonty
Meisetschlag: Míšňany, now Boletice MTA (e)
Meistersdorf: Mistrovice
Melchiorshütte:
Melhut: Chodská Lhota
Melm: Jelm
Melmitz: Melnice
Melnik: Mělník
Meltsch: Melč
Menian: Menany
Meretitz: Miřetice u Vintířova, p. of Radonice (Chomutov District)
Merkelsdorf: Merklovice, p. of Teplice nad Metují
Merkelsgrün: Merklín (Karlovy Vary District)
Merklin: Merklín (Plzeň-South District)
Merklowitz: Merklovice, p. of Vamberk
Meronitz: Měrunice
Merotein: Mirotínek, p. of Tvrdkov
Merschlitz (Merzlitz): Mrzlice, p. of Hrobčice
Mertendorf: Merboltice
Merzdorf:
Břevniště, p. of Hamr na Jezeře
Martiněves, p. of Jílové
Martinice v Krkonoších
Martínkovice
Meseritz: Meziříčí, p. of Kadaň
Mesimost: Veselí nad Lužnicí II
Mesletsch: Mezilečí
Mesoles: Mezholezy, p. of Miskovice
Messendorf: Mezina
Meßhals: Mezholezy (former Horšovský Týn District)
Meßholz: Mezholezy (former Domažlice District)
Metschin (Mietschin): Měčín
Mettilowitz: Metylovice
Metzling: Meclov
Michalkowitz: Michálkovice, p. of Ostrava
Michelob (Micholup): Měcholupy (Louny District)
Michelsberg (Michaelsberg): Michalovy Hory, p. of Chodová Planá
Michelsdorf:
Ostrov (Ústí nad Orlicí District)
Veliká Ves (Chomutov District)
Michetschlag: Javoří
Michnitz: Michnice, p. of Rožmitál na Šumavě
Michowitz: Mnichovice (Benešov District)
Michowka: Michovka, p. of Koberovy
Mierowitz: Měrovice nad Hanou
Mies:
Měchov, p. of Otročín
Mechová, p. of Lipová (Cheb District)
Stříbro
Miesau: Vyšný, now Křišťanov (e)
Mieschitz: Mesice B,32
Miezmanns: Micmanice
Milau: Milov
Milay: Milá, p. of Bečov
Milbes: Milovany, now Libavá MTA (e)
Mildenau: Luh, now Raspenava
Mildeneichen: Lužec, now Raspenava
Mileschau: Milešov
Miletin: Miletín
Miletitz: Miletice
Milikau:
(Millikau): Milíkov (Frýdek-Místek District)
Milíkov, p. of Černá (Žďár nad Sázavou District)
Milkov, now Lestkov (Tachov District) (e)
Milin: Milín
Militschowes: Milíčeves, p. of Slatiny
Milkendorf: Milotice nad Opavou
Millay: Milá, p. of Bečov
Milles: Mlýnec, p. of Přimda
Milleschau: Milešov, p. of Velemín
Millestau: Milhostov, p. of Zádub-Závišín
Millik: Milence, p. of Dešenice
Millikau: Milíkov, p. of Stříbro
Millonitz (Milonitz): Milonice (Blansko District)
Millotitz (an der Betschwa): Milotice nad Bečvou
Millowitz: Milovice (Břeclav District)
Miloschitz: Milošice, p. of Měcholupy (Louny District)
Miloschowitz: Milošovice, p. of Vlastějovice
Milostowitz: Milostovice, p. of Opava
Milotitz: Milotice
Milowitz: Milovice
Milsau: Milžany, now Kadaň (e)
Miltigau: Milíkov (Cheb District)
Miltschin: Miličín
Miltschitz: Milčice
Miltschowes: Milčeves, p. of Žatec
Minion (Minien, Miniendorf): Měnany
Minichschlag: Martínkov
Minichschlag: Mnichovice, now Loučovice
Minkwitz: Minkovice, p. of Višňová (Liberec District)
Mireschowitz: Mirošovice, p. of Hrobčice
Miretitz (Mirschetitz): Miřetice (Chrudim District)
Mirikau: Mírkov
Mirkowitz: Mirkovice
Miroditz: Mirotice, p. of Bochov
Miroschau:
Mirošov (Jihlava District)
Mirošov (Žďár nad Sázavou District)
Miröschau: Mirošov (Rokycany District)
Miroschowitz: Mirošovice
Mirotein (Měrotein): Měrotín
Mirotitz: Mirotice
Mirowitz: Mirovice
Mirschikau: Mířkov
Misching: Měšín
Miserau: Mizerov, p. of Karviná
Miskowitz: Myslkovice
Misliboritz (Missliborzitz): Myslibořice
Misloschowitz (Misloczowitz): Mysločovice
Mislowitz: Myslovice
Misslitz: Miroslav (Znojmo District)
Mistek: Místek, p. of Frýdek-Místek
Mistelholz: Borová, p. of Chvalšiny
Mistlholzkollern: Borovští Uhlíři, now Chvalšiny
Mistrzowitz: Mistřovice, p. of Český Těšín
Mitrowitz: Mitrovice, p. of Moravičany
Mitschowitz: Mičovice
Mittel Bludowitz: Prostřední Bludovice, p. of Horní Bludovice
Mitteldorf:
Prostředkovice, p. of Suchá
Prostřední Rokytnice, now Rokytnice v Orlických horách
Mittelgrund: Děčín XV-Prostřední Žleb
Mittelhof: Prostřední Dvůr, p. of Vítkov
Mittelkörnsalz: Prostřední Krušec, p. of Hartmanice (Klatovy District)
Mittel Langenau: Prostřední Lánov, p. of Lánov
Mittelwald: Hranice VIII-Středolesí
Mitterberg: Račí, p. of Horní Vltavice
Mitterdorf: Miroslav (Znojmo District)
Mitterwiedern: Prostřední Vydří, p. of Dačice
Mitterzwinzen: Prostřední Svince, p. of Dolní Třebonín
Mladejow: Mladějov
Mladetzko: Mladecko
Mladotitz: Mladotice
Mlasowitz: Mlázovice
Mlazow: Mlazovy
Mlikowitz: Mlékovice
Mnich: Mnich (Pelhřimov District)
Mnichowitz: Mnichovice
Mnienan: Měnany
Mnischek: Mníšek pod Brdy
Mochau (Mohau): Mochov, p. of Hartmanice (Klatovy District)
Mochow: Mochov
Modlan: Modlany
Modlenitz: Modlenice, p. of Vimperk
Mödlau: Medlov (Brno-Country District)
Mödlitz: Medlice, now Jakartovice
Modran: Prague-Modřany
Mödritz: Modřice M,3
Modschiedl: Močidlec, p. of Pšov
Mönitz: Měnín
Möritschau: Mořičov, p. of Ostrov (Karlovy Vary District)
Mösing: Mezi
Mohelno: Mohelno
Mogolzen: Bukovec
Mohr: Mory, p. of Podbořany
Mohradorf: Zálužné, p. of Vítkov
Mokowitz: Hřivínov, p. of Verušičky
Mokra: Mokrá, p. of Vesce
Mokrau:
Mokrá, p. of Čichalov
Mokrá, p. of Mokrá-Horákov
Mokrolasetz: Mokré Lazce
Moldau:
Moldava (Teplice District)
Vltava (river)
Moldautein (Moldauthein): Týn nad Vltavou
Moletein: Maletín
Molgau: Málkov, p. of Přimda
Mönchsdorf: Mniší, p. of Kopřivnice
Möndrik: Mendryka, p. of Janov (Svitavy District)
Moraschitz:
Morašice (Chrudim District)
Morašice (Pardubice District)
Morašice (Svitavy District)
Moratitz: Morašice (Znojmo District)
Morawan: Moravany (Pardubice District)
Morawes: Moravěves, p. of Havraň
Morawetsch: Moraveč
Morawetz: Moravec
Morawitschan: Moravičany
Morawitz: Moravice
Morbes: Moravany (Brno-Country District)
Morchenstern (Morchelstern): Smržovka
Moritz (Morzitz): Mořice
Mörkau: Mírkov, p. of Povrly
Morkowitz: Morkovice, p. of Morkovice-Slížany
Morwan: Moravany, p. of Řehlovice
Moschen: Mošnov, p. of Bžany (Teplice District)
Mosern: Mojžíř, p. of Ústí nad Labem
Mosetstift: Mackova Lhota, now Ktiš
Moskelle: Mostkov, p. of Oskava
Moskowitz: Mackovice
Mosting: Mostice
Mostau: Mostov, p. of Odrava
Mosty: Mosty u Jablunkova
Motitschin: Švermov, p. of Kladno
Mottowitz: Matějovice, p. of Dešenice
Motzdorf: Mackov
Moyne: Mojné
Mraditz: Mradice, p. of Postoloprty
Mrakotin: Mrákotín (Chrudim District)
Mritsch: Mříč, p. of Křemže
Mscheno:
Mšené-lázně
Mšeno
Muckenschlag (Mükenschlag): Komáří Paseka, now Přední Výtoň (e)
Muckenbrunn: Studénka, p. of Štoky
Muglinau: Muglinov, p. of Ostrava
Müglitz: Mohelnice
Mugrau: Mokrá, p. of Černá v Pošumaví
Mühlbach: Pomezí nad Ohří
Mühlberg: Lesík, p. of Nejdek
Mühldorf: Mlýnská, now Loučovice (e)
Mühlendorf: Smilov, p. of Stráž nad Ohří
Mühlessen: Milhostov
Mühlgrün: Mlýnek, p. of Nový Kostel
Mühlfraun: Milfron
Mühlhäuseln: Mlýnské Domky
Mühlhausen:
Milevsko
Nelahozeves
Mühlhöfen: Milevo
Mühlloch: Mílov
Mühlloh: Milov
Mühlnöd: Milná, p. of Frymburk
Mühlscheibe: Mlýnice, p. of Nová Ves (Liberec District)
Mukow: Mukov, p. of Hrobčice
Müllerschlag, also Mlinarowitz: Mlynářovice
Müllersgrün: Milesov
Müllestau: Milhostov, p. of Zádub-Závišín
Mülln: Štědrá, p. of Kynšperk nad Ohří
München: Mnichov, p. of Velké Chvojno
Münchengrätz: Mnichovo Hradiště
Münchleins: Minisek
Münchhof: Mírová
Münchsberg: Vojnův Městec
Münchsdorf: Hvoždany
Münitz: Minice, p. of Velemyšleves
Münkendorf: Minkovice
Münchsfeld: Mnichovství
Mürau: Mírov
Mukarschow: Mukařov, p. of Malá Skála
Mukowa: Buková, p. of Mezholezy (former Horšovský Týn District)
Muncifay (Munzifay): Smečno
Munker: Mukařov, p. of Lovečkovice
Murchova: Mrchojedy
Murk: Mořkov
Muschau: Mušov, now Pasohlávky (e)
Muslau: Muzlov, now Březová nad Svitavou
Mutenitz: Mutěnice (Strakonice District)
Mutowitz (Mutiowitz): Mutějovice
Muttersdorf: Mutěnín
Mutzgern: Muckov, p. of Černá v Pošumaví
Mutzken: Muckov, p. of Bor (Tachov District)
Mysliw: Myslív

N

Nabsel: Bzí, p. of Železný Brod
Nachles: Náhlov, now Frymburk
Nachod: Náchod
Nadejkow (Nadiegkau): Nadějkov
Nadschow: Hnacov
Nahlau: Náhlov, p. of Ralsko
Nahoretitz: Nahořečice, p. of Valeč (Karlovy Vary District)
Nahoschitz: Nahošice, p. of Blížejov
Nakel: Náklo
Nakersch: Nákří
Nallesgrün: Nadlesí, p. of Loket
Namiescht: Náměšť na Hané
Namiest (an der Oslawa): Náměšť nad Oslavou
Napajedl (Napagedl): Napajedla
Nassaberg: Nasavrky
Nassenbart: Mokrovousy
Nassendorf: Hely, p. of Krásná Lípa
Nassengrub: Mokřiny, p. of Aš
Natscheradetz: Načeradec
Natschung: Načetín, p. of Kalek
Nawarow: Návarov, p. of Zlatá Olešnice (Jablonec nad Nisou District)
Nawsi: Návsí
Nebahau: Nebahovy
Nebanitz: Nebanice
Nebes: Nedvězí, p. of Rohle
Nebillau: Nebílovy
Nebosedl: Novosedly, p. of Pšov
Nebotein: Hněvotín
Nebuzel: Nebužely
Nechanitz: Nechanice
Nechwalitz: 
Nechvalice
Nechvalice, p. of Bystřany
Nedakonitz: Nedakonice
Nedraschitz: Nedražice, p. of Kostelec (Tachov District)
Nedweiss: Nedvězí, p. of Olomouc
Nedwieditz: Nedvědice
Nefke: Hněvkov, p. of Zábřeh
Neid: Závist, p. of Rybník (Domažlice District)
Nekor: Nekoř
Nemcitz:
Němčice (Domažlice District)
Němčice (Strakonice District)
Nemelkau:
Nemilkov, p. of Lišnice
Nemilkov, p. of Velhartice
Nemetschken: Němečky, p. of Ohníč
Nemetzky (Niemetzke): Sněžné (Žďár nad Sázavou District)
Nemischl: Nemyšl
Nemschen: Němčí, p. of Malečov
Nemtschitz: Němčice, Horní Němčice
Neosablitz: Nezabylice
Neplachowitz: Neplachovice
Nepodritz: Velké Nepodřice, p. of Dobev
Nepomischl: Nepomyšl
Nepomuk: Capartice, p. of Klenčí pod Čerchovem
Neratowitz: Neratovice
Neretein: Neředín, p. of Olomouc
Neschikau: Nežichov, p. of Toužim
Neschwitz: Děčín XXXIII-Nebočady
Nesdenitz: Nezdenice
Nesnaschow: Neznášov, p. of Rožnov (Náchod District)
Nesnaschow (Nezdaschow): Neznašov, p. of Všemyslice
Nesnitz: Nezdice, p. of Teplá
Nespitz: Nespice, p. of Vacov
Nespoding: Mezipotočí, p. of Kájov
Nesselbach: Větrná, now Malšín
Nesselsdorf: Kopřivnice
Nestersitz: Neštědice, p. of Povrly
Nestomitz: Neštěmice, p. of Ústí nad Labem
Netolitz (Nettoliz): Netolice
Netrobitz: Netřebice (Český Krumlov District)
Netschenitz: Nečemice, p. of Tuchořice
Netschetin: Nečtiny
Netschich: Nečichy, p. of Louny
Netschin: Nečín
Nettin: Netín
Networitz: Netvořice
Neubäu: Novosedly, p. of Nemanice
Neubäuhütten: Novosedelské Hutě, p. of Nemanice
Neu Benatek: Benátky nad Jizerou I
Neuberg:
Podhradí (Cheb District)
Tisovka, p. of Ktiš
Neubidschow (Neubydžow): Nový Bydžov
Neu Biela: Nová Bělá, p. of Ostrava
Neubistritz (Neu-Bistritz): Nová Bystřice
Neu Bohmen: Nová Bohyně, p. of Malšovice
Neubrunn: Nová Studnice, p. of Hradečno
Neubürgles: Nový Hrádek
Neu Cerekwe (Neu Zerekwe): Nová Cerekev
Neudek:
Najdek, p. of Lodhéřov
Nejdek
Neu Donawitz: Nové Stanovice, p. of Stanovice (Karlovy Vary District)
Neudorf:
Děčín XX-Nová Ves
Konstantinovy Lázně
Lázně Bělohrad
Moravská Nová Ves
Nová Ves (Český Krumlov District)
Nová Ves (Sokolov District)
Nová Ves, p. of Děkov
Nová Ves, p. of Hora Svatého Šebestiána
Nová Ves, p. of Kocbeře
Nová Ves, p. of Křižovatka
Nová Ves, p. of Litovel
Nová Ves, p. of Ostrava
Nová Ves, p. of Třemešné
Ostrožská Nová Ves
(Neudorf-Alt): Vysoká, p. of Malá Morava
Žárová, p. of Velké Losiny
Neudorf an der Neiße: Nová Ves nad Nisou
Neudorf an der Popelka: Nová Ves nad Popelkou
Neudorf bei Bautsch: Nové Oldřůvky, now Libavá MTA (e)
Neudorf bei Plan: Trstěnice (Cheb District)
Neudörfel:
Česká Ves, p. of Domašín
Nová Ves, p. of Teplice
Nová Ves, p. of Volfartice
Nová Ves u Pláně, p. of Homole u Panny
Nová Véska, p. of Norberčany
Nová Véska, p. of Staré Město (Bruntál District)
Nová Víska, p. of Bezvěrov
Nová Víska, now Boletice MTA (e)
Nová Víska, p. of Dolní Poustevna
Nová Víska, p. of Město Albrechtice
Nová Víska, p. of Nová Ves (Liberec District)
Neudörfl:
Nová Víska, p. of Kadaň
Nová Víska, p. of Hájek (Karlovy Vary District)
Nová Víska, p. of Stružná
Nová Víska u Rokle, p. of Rokle
Neu Ehrenberg: Nové Křečany, p. of Staré Křečany
Neuenbrand: Nový Ždár, p. of Aš
Neuenburg an der Elbe: Nymburk
Neu Erbersdorf: Nové Heřminovy
Neuern: Nýrsko
Neufalkenburg: Zámecká, p. of Jablonné v Podještědí
Neufang: Stříbrné Hory, p. of Horní Město
Neufürstenhütte: Nová Knížecí Huť, now Lesná (Tachov District) (e)
Neugarten: Zahrádky (Česká Lípa District)
Neugasse: Nová Ulice, p. of Olomouc
Neugebäu: Nový Svět, p. of Borová Lada
Neugedein: Kdyně
Neu Georgswalde: Nový Jiříkov, p. of Jiříkov
Neugeschrei: Nové Zvolání
Neugrafenwalde: Nové Hraběcí, p. of Šluknov
Neugramatin: Nový Kramolín
Neugrund: Novosedlo, p. of Žandov
Neuhammer (bei Karlsbad): Nové Hamry
Neu Harzdorf: Liberec XVI-Nový Harcov
Neuhaus: Jindřichův Hradec
Neuhäusel: Nové Domky, p. of Loučovice
Neuhäusl:
Hlupenov, p. of Bor (Tachov District)
Nové Domky, p. of Rozvadov
Neuhäuser:
Nové Chalupy, p. of Nová Pec
Nové Chalupy, now Volary (e)
Nové Domy, p. of Oloví
Neuhof:
Nové Dvory, p. of Bystřany
Nový Dvůr (Nymburk District)
Nový Dvůr, p. of Bor (Tachov District)
Nový Dvůr, p. of Bělá nad Radbuzou
Nový Dvůr, p. of Stěbořice
Neu Hradek (Neuhradek): Nový Hrádek
Neu Hrosenkau (Neu Hrosinkau, Neu Traubendorf): Nový Hrozenkov
Neuhübel: Nová Horka, p. of Studénka
Neuhüblern: Nová Houžna
Neuhurkenthal: Nová Hůrka, p. of Prášily
Neuhütten: Nová Huť, now Blovice
Neu Hwiezdlitz: Nové Hvězdlice, p. of Hvězdlice
Neujahrsdorf: Nouzov, p. of Litíč
Neulangendorf: Nová Dlouhá Ves
Neuofen: Nová Pec
Neukaunitz: Nové Kounice, p. of Bochov
Neukirchen: Nový Kostel
Neu Knin: Nový Knín
Neu Kolin: Kolín
Neu Königgrätz: Nový Hradec Králové, p. of Hradec Králové
Neu Kreibitz: Nová Chřibská, p. of Rybniště
Neuland: Ostré, p. of Úštěk
Neulosimthal: Jedlina
Neu Lublitz: Nové Lublice
Neuluh: Nový Luhov, p. of Brniště
Neumark: Všeruby (Domažlice District)
Neumarkt: Úterý
Neumettl (Neumittel): Neumětely
Neu Mitrowitz: Nové Mitrovice
Neu Modlan: Nové Modlany, p. of Krupka
Neu Moletein: Nový Maletín, p. of Maletín
Neumühle: Nemile
Neundorf: Nová Ves (Liberec District)
Neu Oderberg: Nový Bohumín, p. of Bohumín
Neu Ohlisch: Nová Oleška, p. of Huntířov
Neuötting-Vtschelnitz: Nová Včelnice
Neupaka: Nová Paka
Neu Parisau: Nový Pařezov, p. of Pařezov
Neu Paulsdorf: Liberec XIII-Nové Pavlovice
Neupohlen: Nové Spolí, p. of Český Krumlov
Neu Possigkau: Díly
Neu Prennet: Nový Spálenec, p. of Česká Kubice
Neuprerau: Nový Přerov
Neu Raunek: Nový Rounek, now Vyskytná nad Jihlavou
Neu Raußnitz (Neu Rausnitz): Rousínov
Neu Reichenau: Nový Rychnov
Neureisch: Nová Říše
Neu Rettendorf: Nové Kocbeře, p. of Kocbeře
Neurode: Nová Pláň
Neu Rognitz: Nový Rokytník, p. of Trutnov
Neurohlau (Neu Rohlau): Nová Role
Neu Rothwasser: Nová Červená Voda, p. of Stará Červená Voda
Neusattl: Nové Sedlo
Neusattl (an der Naser): Novosedly nad Nežárkou
Neuschloss: Nové Hrady (Ústí nad Orlicí District)
Neu Sedlitz: Nové Sedlice
Neu Serowitz: Nové Syrovice
Neusiedl:
Novosedly (Břeclav District)
Novosedly, p. of Kájov
Neusorge:
Nová Starost, p. of Rynoltice
Starostín, p. of Meziměstí
Neuspitzenberg: Nový Špičák, now Boletice MTA (e)
Neustadt:
Děčín II-Nové Město
Nové Město, p. of Karviná
Nové Město, p. of Jáchymov
Nové Město, p. of Moldava (Teplice District)
Neustadt an der Tafelfichte: Nové Město pod Smrkem
Neustadt an der Mettau: Nové Město nad Metují
Neustadtl:
Dolní Bělá
Jezvé, p. of Stružnice
Nové Městečko, p. of Dlouhá Ves (Klatovy District)
Nové Město (Hradec Králové District)
Nové Město na Moravě
Stráž (Tachov District)
Vestřev, now Dolní Olešnice
Neu Steindorf: Nový Hubenov, now Hubenov
Neustift:
Blatiny, p. of Sněžné (Žďár nad Sázavou District)
Lhota, p. of Číměř
Nová Lhota, now Černá v Pošumaví (e)
Nové Sady, p. of Olomouc
Polečnice, now Polná na Šumavě
Neustraschitz: Nové Strašecí
Neustupow: Neustupov
Neuteich: Nový Rybník
Neuthal: Nové Údolí
Neutitschein (Neu Titschein): Nový Jičín
Neu Traubendorf: Nový Hrozenkov
Neu Tschestin: Nový Čestín, p. of Mochtín
Neuturkowitz: Nové Dobrkovice, p. of Český Krumlov
Neu Ullersdorf: Nové Losiny, p. of Jindřichov (Šumperk District)
Neu Vogelseifen: Nová Rudná, p. of Rudná pod Pradědem
Neu Waltersdorf: Nové Valteřice, p. of Moravský Beroun
Neuwelt:
Nový Svět, p. of Harrachov
Nový Svět, p. of Slatina (Nový Jičín District)
Neu Wessely (Neuwesseln): Nové Veselí
Neu Wilmsdorf: Nové Vilémovice, p. of Uhelná
Neuwirthshaus: Nová Hospoda, p. of Bor (Tachov District)
Neu Würben: Nové Vrbno, p. of Větřkovice
Neu Zechsdorf: Nové Těchanovice, p. of Vítkov
Neu Zedlitsch: Nové Sedlište
Neu Zerekwe: Nová Cerekev
Neweklau: Neveklov
Nezamislitz: Nezamyslice
Nezdenitz: Nezdenice
Nezditz (Nestitz): Nezdice na Šumavě
Nezwiestitz: Nezvěstice
Nickelsdorf: Mikulovice, p. of Nová Ves v Horách
Nieder Altstadt: Dolní Staré Město, p. of Trutnov
Niederbaumgarten: Dolní Pěna
Nieder Bausow: Dolní Bousov
Nieder Berzdorf:
Dolní Pertoltice, p. of Pertoltice (Liberec District)
Dolní Suchá, p. of Hrádek nad Nisou
Niederbirkicht: Podbřezí
Nieder Böhmisch Rothwasser: Dolní Čermná
Nieder Bludowitz: Bludovice, p. of Havířov
Niederbuseln: Dolní Bušínov, p. of Zábřeh
Nieder Dattin: Dolní Datyně, p. of Havířov
Nieder Ebersdorf: Dolní Habartice
Niederehrenberg: Rumburk 3-Dolní Křečany
Nieder Einsiedel (Niedereinsiedel): Dolní Poustevna
Nieder Eisenberg: Dolní Ruda, now Ruda nad Moravou
Nieder Erlitz: Dolní Orlice, p. of Červená Voda (Ústí nad Orlicí District)
Nieder Falkenau: Dolní Falknov, p. of Kytlice
Nieder Forst: Dolní Fořt, p. of Uhelná
Nieder Georgenthal (Niedergeorgenthal): Dolní Jiřetín, p. of Horní Jiřetín (e)
Niedergrund (Nieder Grund):
Děčín XIV-Dolní Žleb
Dolní Podluží
Dolní Údolí, p. of Zlaté Hory
Nieder Hanichen: Liberec VIII-Dolní Hanychov
Niederhof: Dolní Dvůr B,23
Nieder Kalna: Dolní Kalná
Niederkamnitz: Dolní Kamenice, p. of Česká Kamenice
Nieder Koblitz: Dolní Chobolice, p. of Liběšice (Litoměřice District)
Nieder Kreibitz: Dolní Chřibská, p. of Chřibská
Nieder Krupai (Nieder Gruppei): Dolní Krupá
Nieder Langenau: Dolní Lanov B,23
Nieder Leuten: Dolní Lutyně
Niederleutensdorf: Dolní Litvínov, p. of Litvínov
Nieder Lichtenwalde: Dolní Světlá, p. of Mařenice
Niederliebich: Dolní Libchava, p. of Česká Lípa
Nieder Lindenwiese: Lipová-lázně
Nieder Marklowitz: Dolní Marklovice, p. of Petrovice u Karviné
Nieder Mohrau (Niedermohrau):
Dolní Morava
Dolní Moravice
Nieder Paulowitz: Dolní Povelice, p. of Bohušov
Niederpolitz: Dolní Police, p. of Žandov
Nieder Preschkau: Dolní Prysk, p. of Prysk
Niederreuth: Dolní Paseky, p. of Aš
Niederringelberg: Dolní Výšina, p. of Obora (Tachov District)
Nieder Rochlitz: Dolní Rokytnice, p. of Rokytnice nad Jizerou
Niedersuchau (Nieder Suchau): Dolní Suchá, p. of Havířov
Nieder Tierlitzko: Dolní Těrlicko, p. of Těrlicko
Niederwessig: Dolní Vysoké, p. of Úštěk
Niederwigstein: Podhradí, p. of Vítkov
Nieder Wildgrub: Dolní Václavov, p. of Václavov u Bruntálu
Niedertscherma: Dolní Čermná
Niederulgersdorf: Děčín VIII-Dolní Oldřichov
Niederullersdorf: Dolní Oldřiš, p. of Bulovka
Niederwald: Dolní Les, p. of Vlčice (Jeseník District)
Niederzukau: Dolní Žukov, p. of Český Těšín
Niemes: Mimoň
Niemsching: Němče, p. of Větřní
Niemtschau: Němčany, p. of Krásný Dvůr
Niemtschitz:
Němčice (Blansko District)
Němčice (Prachatice District)
Němčice (Strakonice District)
Nikl: Mikuleč
Niklasberg: Mikulov (Teplice District)
Niklasdorf: Mikulovice (Jeseník District)
Nikles: Raškov, p. of Bohdíkov
Niklowitz:
Mikolajice
Mikulovice (Znojmo District)
Nikolsburg: Mikulov
Nimburg: Nymburk
Nimlau: Nemilany, p. of Olomouc
Nimvorgut: Nuzarov
Ninowitz: Jinonice
Nirschlern: Koryta, now Rožmitál na Šumavě (exctinct)
Nischburg: Nižbor
Nischkau: Nížkov
Nitschenau: Lhotka, p. of Vítkov
Nitzau: Nicov
Niwnitz: Nivnice
Nixdorf: Mikulášovice
Nollendorf: Nakléřov
Nonnengrün: Hluboká, p. of Milhostov
Nothof: Nouzov
Neustadtl: Dolní Bělá (Písek)
Nowakowitz: Novakovice
Nudelbaum: Modlibohov
Nürnberg: Norberčany
Nürschan (Nyrschan): Nýřany
Nuserau: Nuserov
Nußlau: Nosislav

O

Ober Altstadt: Horní Staré Město, p. of Trutnov
Oberbaumgarten: Horní Pěna
Ober Berschkowitz: Horní Beřkovice
Ober Berzdorf: Liberec XXII-Horní Suchá
Oberberzdorf: Horní Pertoltice, p. of Pertoltice (Liberec District)
Ober Betschwa: Horní Bečva
Ober Birken (Ober Bris): Horní Bříza
Ober Bludowitz: Horní Bludovice
Ober Böhmisch Rothwasser: Horní Čermná
Ober Borry: Horní Bory, p. of Bory (Žďár nad Sázavou District)
Ober Brand: Horní Žďár, p. of Ostrov (Karlovy Vary District)
Ober Breitenstein: Horní Třebonín, p. of Dolní Třebonín
Ober Chodau: Horní Chodov
Ober Dannowitz: Horní Dunajovice
Ober Dattin: Horní Datyně, p. of Vratimov
Ober Domaslowitz: Horní Domaslavice
Oberdorf:
Horní Ves, now Chomutov
Horní Ves, p. of Litvínov
Horní Ves, p. of Trstěnice (Cheb District)
Ober Dubenky (Ober Dubenken): Horní Dubenky
Ober Ebersdorf: Horní Habartice
Ober Eisenberg: Horní Ruda, now Ruda nad Moravou
Ober Einsiedel (Obereinsiedel): Horní Poustevna, p. of Dolní Poustevna
Ober Ellgoth (Oberellgoth): Horní Lhota (Ostrava-City District)
Ober Erlitz: Horní Orlice, p. of Červená Voda (Ústí nad Orlicí District)
Ober Forst: Horní Fořt, p. of Uhelná
Oberfröschau: Horní Břečkov
Ober Gallitsch: Horní Kaliště, now Dolní Dvořiště (e)
Obergeorgenthal: Horní Jiřetín
Ober Gerpitz: Brno-Horní Heršpice
Obergoß: Horní Kosov, p. of Jihlava
Ober Gosolup: Horní Kozolupy
Ober Gostitz: Horní Hoštice, p. of Javorník (Jeseník District)
Obergramling: Horní Kramolín, p. of Teplá
Obergrund:
Děčín XI-Horní Žleb
Horní Podluží
Horní Údolí, p. of Zlaté Hory
Ober Kochet: Kochánov, p. of Hartmanice (Klatovy District)
Ober Krupai (Ober Gruppei): Horní Krupá, p. of Ralsko
Oberhäuser: Rohy, now Brloh (Český Krumlov District)
Oberhaid (Ober Haid):
Horní Dvořiště
Zbytiny
Ober Hammer: Hoření Hamr, now Velké Hamry
Ober Hanichen: Liberec XIX-Horní Hanychov
Oberheidisch: Horní Hedeč, p. of Králíky
Ober Heinzendorf: Horní Hynčina, p. of Pohledy
Oberhennersdorf: Rumburk 2-Horní Jindřichov
Ober Hermsdorf: Horní Heřmanice, p. of Bernartice (Jeseník District)
Ober Hillersdorf: Horní Holcovice
Oberhof: Nový Dvůr, p. of Zdíkov
Ober Hohenelbe: Hořejší Vrchlabí, p. of Vrchlabí
Ober Hrachowitz: Dolní Hrachovice
Ober Jeleni (Ober Jeleny): Horní Jelení
Ober-Johnsdorf: Horní Třešňovec
Oberkamnitz: Horní Kamenice, p. of Česká Kamenice
Ober Koblitz: Horní Chobolice, p. of Liběšice (Litoměřice District)
Oberkörnsalz: Hořejší Krušec, p. of Hartmanice (Klatovy District)
Ober Kozolup: Horní Kozolupy
Ober Kralowitz: Horní Kralovice
Ober Kreibitz: Horní Chřibská, p. of Chřibská
Ober Langenau: Horní Lánov, p. of Lánov
Ober Langendorf: Horní Dlouhá
Oberlangendorf: Horní Dlouhá Loučka, now Dlouhá Loučka (Olomouc District)
Oberleutensdorf (Oberleitensdorf): Horní Litvínov, p. of Litvínov
Ober Lhotta: Horní Lhota (Zlín District)
Ober Lichtenwalde: Horní Světlá, p. of Mařenice
Oberlichtbuchet: Horní Světlé Hory, now Strážný (e)
Ober Lindewiese: Horní Lipová, p. of Lipová-lázně
Ober Litsch: Horní Lideč
Ober Lohma (Oberlohma): Horní Lomany, p. of Františkovy Lázně
Oberlosau: Horní Lažany, p. of Lipová (Cheb District)
Obermarkschlag: Horní Hraničná, now Přední Výtoň (e)
Ober Maxdorf: Horní Maxov, p. of Lučany nad Nisou
Obermohrau: Horní Morava, p. of Dolní Morava
Obermoldau: Horní Vltavice
Ober Moschtienitz: Horní Moštěnice
Oberndorf: Horní Ves, p. of Třebeň
Ober Neuern: Horní Nýrsko, now Nýrsko
Ober Neugrün: Horní Nivy, p. of Dolní Nivy
Ober Niemtsch: Horní Němčí
Obernitz: Obrnice
Oberoggold: Horní Okolí
Ober Paulowitz: Horní Povelice, p. of Liptaň
Oberplan: Horní Planá
Ober Potschernitz: Prague 20-Horní Počernice
Oberpolitz: Horní Police
Ober Prausnitz: Horní Brusnice
Ober Preschkau: Horní Prysk, p. of Prysk
Oberpriesen: Vysoké Březno, p. of Malé Březno (Most District)
Oberreuth: Horní Paseky, p. of Aš
Oberringelberg: Horní Výšina, p. of Halže
Ober Rosenthal: Liberec VII-Horní Růžodol
Ober Roschlitz: Horní Rokytnice, p. of Rokytnice nad Jizerou
Ober Rotschau (Ober Rotschow): Horní Ročov, now Ročov
Obersablat: Horní Záblatí
Ober Sandau: Horní Žandov
Oberschaar: Žáry, p. of Město Albrechtice
Oberschlag: Milešice
Oberschlagl: Horní Drkolná, now Vyšší Brod (e)
Oberschneedorf: Horní Snežná
Oberschön: Dolní Dvory, p. of Cheb
Oberschönbach: Horní Luby, p. of Luby (Cheb District)
Oberschönhub: Horní Přísahov, now Vyšší Brod (e)
Ober Schossenreuth: Horní Částkov, p. of Habartov
Ober Schwarzbrunn: Horní Černá Studnice, p. of Nová Ves nad Nisou
Ober Sekerschan (Ober Sekrzan): Horní Sekyřany, p. of Heřmanova Huť
Obersinetschlag: Horní Příbrání, now Pohorská Ves (e)
Oberstankau: Horní Stankov
Obersteindörfl: Zbraslav, now Dolní Dvořiště (e)
Ober Studenetz: Horní Studenec, p. of Ždírec nad Doubravou
Obersuchau (Ober Suchau): Horní Suchá
Oberteschau: Hořejší Těšov, p. of Hartmanice (Klatovy District)
Ober Tierlitzko: Horní Těrlicko, p. of Těrlicko
Obertor: Horní Brána, p. of Český Krumlov
Ober Toschonowitz: Horní Tošanovice
Oberulgersdorf: Děčín XXI-Horní Oldřichov
Ober Uresch: Horní Ureš (Horní Uráž)
Obervollmau: Horní Folmava, p. of Česká Kubice
Ober Wernersdorf: Horní Vernéřovice, now Jívka
Oberwessig: Horní Vysoké, p. of Levín
Ober Wigstein: Dubová, now Radkov (Opava District)
Ober Wildgrub: Horní Václavov, p. of Václavov u Bruntálu
Ober Wisternitz: Horní Věstonice
Ober Dreihöfen: Horní Záhoří, p. of Lubenec
Oberzassau: Horní Cazov (Horní Zasov)
Ober Zerekwe (Ober Cerekwe): Horní Cerekev
Oberzukau: Horní Žukov, p. of Český Těšín
Oberzwinzen: Horní Svince, p. of Dolní Třebonín
Obeschitz: Brno-Sobešice
Obetznitz: Obecnice
Oblas: Oblekovice, p. of Znojmo
Obodersch: Benátky nad Jizerou III
Obristwy: Obříství
Obrowitz: Zábrdovice
Ochsensthall: Volárna, p. of Roudno
Oder: Odra (river)
Oderberg: Bohumín
Oderfurt: Přívoz, p. of Ostrava
Odersch: Oldřišov
Odolenswasser: Odolena Voda
Odrau: Odry
Oed: Poustka
Oels: Olešnice (Blansko District)
Oels-Döberney: Debrné, p. of Mostek (Trutnov District)
Oemau: Soběnov
Ogfolderhaid: Jablonec, now Boletice MTA (e)
Oggold: Okolí
Öhlhütten:
Lhota u Konice, p. of Brodek u Konice
Lhotka u Litultovic
Ohorn: Javorná, p. of Bražec
Ohrad: Ohrada, p. of Bílovec
Ohren: Javory, p. of Malšovice
Ohrensdorf: Střítež nad Ludinou
Ohrnes: Javoří, p. of Maletín
Ojesdetz (Ojestetz, Ojestitz, Ojezd, Ojezdetz): Újezdec
Okenau: Okounov
Okrzischko (Okrischko, Okrizko): Okříšky
Okrouhlík: Mělník
Okrauhlitz: Okrouhlice
Ölberg (Oelberg): Olivětín, p. of Broumov
Olbersdorf:
Albrechtice (Ústí nad Orlicí District)
Albrechtice u Frýdlantu, p. of Frýdlant
Albrechtice u Rýmařova, p. of Břidličná
Město Albrechtice
Olbramowitz: Olbramovice u Votic
Olchowitz:
Oldřichovice (Zlín District)
Oldřichovice, p. of Dešenice
Olhotta (Ollhotta): Lhota, p. of Úštěk
Olleschau: Olšany (Šumperk District)
Olmütz: Olomouc
Olschan: Olšany (Vyškov District)
Olschi (Olschy): Olší (Brno-Country District)
Ölstadtl: Olejovice, now Libavá MTA (e)
Ömau (Oemau): Soběnov
Ondregow: Ondřejov (Pelhřimov District)
Ondrejow: Ondřejov (Prague-East District)
Ondschikowitz: Ondříkovice, p. of Frýdštejn
Opatowitz (Oppatowitz):
Opatovice nad Labem
Velké Opatovice
Opolau: Úpohlavy
Opotschna: Opočno (Louny District)
Opotschno: Opočno (Rychnov nad Kněžnou District)
Oppa: Opava (river)
Oppahof: Dvořisko, p. of Kravaře
Oppatau: Opatov (Třebíč District)
Oppau: Zábřeh, p. of Dolní Benešov
Oppelitz: Opolenec, p. of Kašperské Hory
Oppolz: Tichá, p. of Dolní Dvořiště
Orlau: Orlová
Orlowitz: Orlovice
Orpus: Mezilesí, p. of Kryštofovy Hamry
Oschelin: Ošelín
Oschitz: Osečná
Oskau: Oskava
Oslawan: Oslavany
Ossegg: Osek (Teplice District)
Ossek: Osek nad Bečvou
Oßnitz: Sosnice, now Dolní Dvořiště (e)
Ossowa Bittischka: Osová Bítýška
Ostrau:
Ostrava
Ostrov, p. of Bor (Tachov District)
Ostrov, p. of Žďárec
Ostrov u Stříbra, p. of Kostelec (Tachov District)
Ostrosen: Ostružno, p. of Nezdice na Šumavě
Oswitiman: Osvětimany
Otrokowitz: Otrokovice
Otrotschin: Otročín, p. of Stříbro
Ottau: Zátoň, p. of Větřní
Otten: Otín (Jihlava District)
Ottendorf:
Otice
Otovice (Náchod District)
Ottengrün: Otov
Ottenreuth: Otín, p. of Planá (Tachov District)
Ottenschlag:
Dluhoště, p. of Benešov nad Černou
Otín, p. of Jindřichův Hradec
Otov, now Přední Výtoň (e)
Ottetstift: Otice, p. of Polná na Šumavě
Ottnitz: Otnice
Ottowitz: Otovice (Karlovy Vary District)
Oujezdec: Újezdec
Ouraz: Úraz
Oxbrunn: Březovík, p. of Ktiš

P

Pabelsdorf: Pavlíkov, p. of Třemešné
Padloschin: Podlešín, p. of Stebno
Palitz: Palič, p. of Lipová (Cheb District)
Palkowitz: Palkovice
Palzendorf: Palačov, p. of Starý Jičín
Pamferhütte: Pamferova Huť, now Železná Ruda
Panditz: Bantice
Panzer: Pancíř, p. of Železná Ruda
Pappelsdorf: Topolná
Parchen: Prácheň, p. of Kamenický Šenov
Pardorf: Bavory
Pardubitz: Pardubice
Parfuß: Brno-Bosonohy
Parisau: Pařezov
Parkfried: Bělá, p. of Nová Pec
Parlosa: Brložec, p. of Dobrná
Parnig (Parnik): Parník, p. of Česká Třebová
Parschnitz: Poříčí, p. of Trutnov
Parschowitz: Paršovice
Partschendorf: Bartošovice
Paschtik: Paštiky
Paskau: Paskov
Paslas: Bohuslav, p. of Teplá
Paß: Horní Sedlo, p. of Hrádek nad Nisou
Passek: Paseka (Olomouc District)
Passeken: Paseka, p. of Borová Lada
Passern: Pasovary
Paßnau: Veselov, p. of Žlutice
Pastreichs: Hradišťko, p. of Dačice
Paterhütte: Páteřlkova Huť
Patokrey: Patokryje
Pattersdorf: Bartoušov
Patzau: Pacov
Patzin: Pačín, p. of Bezdružice
Paulina: Pavlína
Paulowitz: Pavlovičky, p. of Olomouc
Paulus: Miletínky, p. of Ktiš
Paulusbrunn: Pavlův Studenec, now Obora (Tachov District) (e)
Pauska: Poustka, p. of Dobkovice
Pausram: Pouzdřany
Pauten: Poutnov, p. of Teplá
Pawinow: Palvinov, p. of Hartmanice (Klatovy District)
Pawlikow: Pavlíkov
Pawlow: Pavlov (Šumperk District)
Pawlowitz:
Pavlovice, p. of Planá (Tachov District)
Pavlovice u Kojetína
Pavlovice u Přerova
Payreschau: Boršov nad Vltavou
Pechbach: Smolná, p. of Rotava
Pechöfen: Smolné Pece
Peichsdorf: Piskořov, p. of Město Albrechtice
Peiperz: Děčín XVI-Přípeř
Pelechow: Pelechov, p. of Železný Brod
Pelkowitz: Pelkovice, p. of Rychnov u Jablonce nad Nisou
Permesgrün: Květnová, p. of Ostrov (Karlovy Vary District)
Petzka: Pecka
Pelechen: Pelechy
Penketitz: Beníkovice, now Boletice MTA (e)
Perletschlag: Perlovice, p. of Prachatice
Perlsberg: Lazy, p. of Lázně Kynžvart
Pern: Beroun, p. of Teplá
Pernartitz: Bernartice, p. of Stráž (Tachov District)
Pernlesdorf: Mostky, p. of Kaplice
Perutz: Peruc
Perschetitz: Horní Brzotice, now Boletice MTA (e)
Peterbach: Petrov, now Polná na Šumavě (e)
Petersburg: Petrohrad
Petersdorf:
Hraničné Petrovice
Petrovice (Bruntál District)
Petrovice, p. of Jablonné v Podještědí)
Petrovice, p. of Skorošice
Vražné
Petersdorf an der Tess: Petrov nad Desnou
Petershofen: Petrkovice
Petersin: Petříkov
Peterswald:
Petříkov, p. of Ostružná
Petrovice (Ústí nad Labem District)
Petřvald (Karviná District)
Petlarn: Žebráky, p. of Hošťka
Petrowitz:
Petrovice (Blansko District)
Petrovice (Příbram District)
Petrovice (Rakovník District)
Petrovice, p. of Malé Svatoňovice
Petrovice, p. of Puklice
Petrovice, p. of Štoky
Petrovice u Sušice
Pustějov
Petrowitz an der Angel: Petrovice nad Úhlavou, p. of Janovice nad Úhlavou
Petrowitz bei Freistadt: Petrovice u Karviné
Petrzkowitz:
Petřkovice, p. of Ostrava
Petřkovice, p. of Starý Jičín
Petschau: Bečov nad Teplou
Petschek (Petschkau): Pečky
Petzer: Pec pod Sněžkou
Petzka: Pecka
Pfaffendorf:
Děčín XXIII-Popovice
Kněžská, p. of Šlapanov
Přísečno, p. of Soběnov
Pfaffengrün: Popovice, p. of Teplá
Pfaffenschlag: Bobovec, now Světlík (e)
Pfauendorf: Pávov, p. of Jihlava
Pfefferschlag: Libínské Sedlo, p. of Prachatice
Pflanzen: Blansko, p. of Kaplice
Pflanzendorf: Hřivčice, p. of Peruc
Pflaumendörfl: Milonice (Vyškov District)
Pföhlwies: Lužná, p. of Kopřivná
Pfraumberg (Pfrauenberg): Přimda
Pher: Pchery
Philippsberg:
Filipov, p. of Česká Kamenice
Filipov, p. of Jiříkov
Filipova Hora, p. of Tlumačov (Domažlice District)
Filipovice, p. of Bělá pod Pradědem
Filipovice, p. of Hradec nad Moravicí
Philippsgrund: Filipka, p. of Oldřichov v Hájích
Philippshütte: Filipova Huť, p. of Modrava
Philippsthal:
Filipová, p. of Loučná nad Desnou
Filipovka, p. of Višňová (Liberec District)
Piberschlag: Pivonice
Pibrans: Příbram
Pickau: Býkov, p. of Býkov-Láryšov
Pichelberg: Boučí, p. of Dolní Nivy
Pichlern: Pihlov
Pientschin: Pěnčín (Liberec District)
Piesling: Písečné
Pießnig: Písečná, p. of Česká Lípa
Pihanken: Běhánky, p. of Dubí
Pilgrams (Pilgram): Pelhřimov
Pilkau: Bílka, p. of Bořislav
Pilletitz: Bílovice, now Boletice MTA (e)
Pilmersreuth: Pelhřimov, p. of Cheb
Pilnikau: Pilníkov
Pilsen: Plzeň
Pilsenschlag: Polzov
Pingetschlag: Skalné, now Hořice na Šumavě (e)
Pinke: Benkov, p. of Uničov
Pintschei: Pěnčín (Jablonec nad Nisou District)
Pirk: Bříza, p. of Cheb
Pirkau: Březí, p. of Ctiboř (Tachov District)
Pirkenhammer: Březová (Karlovy Vary District)
Pirnik: Brníčko, p. of Uničov
Pirnitz: Brtnice
Pirten: Brť, p. of Otročín
Pischel: Pyšel
Pischely: Pyšely
Pischtin: Pištín
Pisek: Písek
Pistau:
Pístov, p. of Chodová Planá
Pístov, p. of Jihlava
Pistowitz: Pístovice, p. of Račice-Pístovice
Pitschkowitz: Býčkovice
Pittarn: Pitárné, p. of Vysoká (Bruntál District)
Pittling: Pytlíkov, p. of Bžany (Teplice District)
Piwana: Pňovany
Piwin: Pivín
Piwonin: Pivonín, p. of Zábřeh
Plaben: Plav
Pladen: Blatno (Louny District)
Plahetschlag: Blažejovice
Plahow: Bláhov, p. of Homole u Panny
Plan:
Planá (České Budějovice District)
Planá (Tachov District)
Plan an der Lainsitz: Planá nad Lužnicí
Planer Brand: Žďár, p. of Chodský Újezd
Planerhof: Planerův Dvůr
Planian (Planan): Plaňany
Planitz: Plánice
Plankus: Planska
Planles: Plánička, p. of Černá v Pošumaví
Plansker Mühle: Planský Mlýn
Plas (Platz): Stráž nad Nežárkou
Plas (Plass): Plazy
Plaschin: see Blaschim
Plaß: Plasy
Plassendorf: Kubička
Platsch: Plaveč (Znojmo District)
Platten:
Blatná, p. of Frymburk
Blatno (Chomutov District)
Horní Blatná
Plattetschlag: Mladoňov, now Boletice MTA (e)
Plattorn: Platoř, p. of Dlouhá Ves (Klatovy District)
Platz: Místo
Platz an der Naser: Stráž nad Nežárkou
Plauschnitz: Ploužnice, p. of Ralsko
Plaw: Plavy
Pleil-Sorgenthal: Černý Potok, p. of Kryštofovy Hamry
Pleschowitz: Plešovice, p. of Zlatá Koruna
Pleßberg: Plešivec (mountain)
Pleßna: Plesná, p. of Ostrava
Plichtitz: Plichtice, p. of Zavlekov
Plöckenstein: Plechý (mountain)
Plöß:
Pláně, p. of Všeruby (Domažlice District)
Pleš, p. of Bělá nad Radbuzou
Ploscha: Blažim (Louny District)
Ploschkowitz: Ploskovice
Plotischt: Plotiště nad Labem, p. of Hradec Králové
Plötsch: Plechy, p. of Nový Malín
Plowitz: Blovice
Pluhow: Pluhův Ždár
Plumberg: Květná, p. of Krajková
Plumenau (Plumau): Plumlov
Pobitz: Babice, p. of Teplá
Pobutsch: Pobučí, p. of Jestřebí (Šumperk District)
Pochlowitz: Dolní Pochlovice, p. of Kynšperk nad Ohří
Pochmühl:
Pocheň, p. of Brumovice (Opava District)
Pocheň, p. of Široká Niva
Pöcken: Pěkovice, p. of Teplá
Podiebrad: Poděbrady
Podersam: Podbořany
Podesdorf: Bohdalovice
Podhorschan:
Podhořany, p. of Nelahozeves
Podhořany u Ronova
Podhursch: Podhůří
Podleß: Podlesí (Příbram District)
Podletitz: Podlesice, p. of Veliká Ves (Chomutov District)
Podol:
Bílé Podolí
Podolí, now Svijany
Prague-Podolí
Vápenný Podol
Podoly: Podolí, p. of Prachatice
Podrasnitz: Podražnice
Podseditz: Podsedice
Podwihof: Podvihov, p. of Opava
Podwurst: Podvoří, now Boletice MTA (e)
Pokatitz: Pokutice, p. of Kadaň
Pokau: Bukov, p. of Ústí nad Labem
Polnisch Leuten: Lutyně, p. of Orlová
Pömmerle (Pömerle): Povrly
Pösigl: Bezděkov, now Boletice MTA (e)
Pössigkau: Bezděkov, p. of Třemešné
Pograth: Podhrad, p. of Cheb
Pohl: Polom (Přerov District)
Pohled (Pochled): Pohleď 
Pohlem: Polom, p. of Bochov
Pohlen: Spolí, p. of Přídolí
Pohrlitz: Pohořelice
Pohorsch:
Pohoř, p. of Odry
Pohořany, p. of Dolany (Olomouc District)
Pohorschan: Pohořany, p. of Žitenice
Pohorz: Pohoří, p. of Malečov
Pokratitz: Pokratice
Polanka an der Oder: Polanka nad Odrou, p. of Ostrava
Polaun: Polubný, p. of Kořenov
Polehraditz (Pollehraditz): Boleradice
Polep (Polepp): Polepy (Litoměřice District)
Polerad:
Polerady (Most District)
Polerady (Prague-East District)
Poliken: Políkno, p. of Toužim
Polin (Pollin): Poleň
Politschka: Polička
Politz an der Mettau: Police nad Metují
Politz an der Elbe: Děčín XXXII-Boletice nad Labem
Polke: Polka, p. of Vápenná
Pollaitz: Police (Šumperk District)
Pollein: Palonín
Pollerskirchen: Úsobí
Polleschowitz (Poleschowitz): Polešovice
Polletitz (Poletitz, Bolletitz): Boletice, p. of Kájov
Polna: Polná
Polnisch Ostrau: Polská Ostrava, now Ostrava
Polschitz (Pollschitz): Dolní Polžice, p. of Bezdružice
Pölter: see Bölten
Polzen: Ploučnice (river)
Pomeisl: Nepomyšl
Pomitsch: Podmyče
Pomuk: Nepomuk
Ponikla: Poniklá
Popelin: Popelín
Popelka: Košíře
Popow: Popov, p. of Štítná nad Vláří-Popov
Popowitz (Poppowitz):
Popovice (Brno-Country District)
Popovice (Uherské Hradiště District)
Poppitz:
Popice
Popice, p. of Jihlava
Popice, p. of Znojmo
Poppowa: Popov, p. of Kostelec (Tachov District)
Poremba: Poruba, p. of Orlová
Porenz: Beranovec, p. of Suchá
Poric (an der Sazawa): Poříčí nad Sázavou
Poritsch: Poříčí, p. of Chyše
Poritschan (Porican): Poříčany
Poritschen (Poritschen/Desfours): Spálené Poříčí
Porschitz (Porzitsch): Poříčí, p. of Boršov nad Vltavou
Porschitz an der Sasau: Poříčí nad Sázavou
Poruba: Poruba, p. of Ostrava
Poschau: Bošov, p. of Vrbice (Karlovy Vary District)
Poschetzau: Božičany
Poschitz: Poseč, p. of Otročín
Poschkau: Boškov, p. of Potštát
Poschlag: Pošlák, now Vyšší Brod (e)
Posluchau: Posluchov, p. of Hlubočky
Posoritz: Pozořice
Possigkau: Postřekov
Possitz: Božice
Postelberg: Postoloprty
Postitz: Božtěšice, p. of Ústí nad Labem
Postrum: Postřelná, p. of Jablonné v Podještědí
Postupitz: Postupice
Potfohre (Potfuhre): Potvorov
Potschapl: Počaply, p. of Terezín
Potschatek: Počátky
Potscherad: Počerady, p. of Výškov
Pottenstein: Potštejn
Potzen: Práčov, p. of Přídolí
Powel: Povel, p. of Olomouc
Pozdiechow (Pozdechow, Posdiechow): Pozděchov
Prachatitz: Prachatice
Prachnian: Práchnany
Prag: Praha
Prag-Teufelhitz: Praha-Dejvice
Prag-Tiefenbach: Praha-Hloubětín
Prag-Kohlfelde: Praha-Hlubočepy
Prag-Kehlen: Praha-Chmelnice
Prag-Körbern: Praha-Košíře
Prag-Strahof: Praha-Strahov
Prag-Veitsberg: Praha-Žižkov
Pragerstift: Pražačka, now Boletice MTA (e)
Prahlitz: Pravlov
Pramles: Branná, now Malšín
Prasch Aujest (Praschno Aujesd): Prašný Újezd
Praschma: Pražmo
Praskoles: Praskolesy
Praskowitz: Prackovice nad Labem
Praslawitz: Přáslavice
Prasseditz: Prosetice, p. of Teplice
Praßles: Zbraslav, p. of Štědrá
Pratzen: Prace
Prause: Brusov, p. of Úštěk
Prawonin: Pravonín
Prchalau: Prchalov, p. of Příbor
Predmeritz (an der Elbe): Předměřice nad Labem
Predslaw: Předslav
Predwojowitz: Předvojovice, p. of Čachrov
Preitenhof Plandry
Prelautsch: Přelouč
Premyslowitz (Przemislowitz): Přemyslovice
Prerau: Přerov
Preschen: Břešťany, now Bílina (e)
Preschkau: Prysk
Presel: Březiny, p. of Malečov
Pressnitz: Přísečnice, now Kryštofovy Hamry (e)
Prestawlk: Přestavlky (Chrudim District)
Prestein: Přestání, p. of Štědrá
Prestitz: Přeštice
Pribram (Przibram): Příbram
Prichowitz: Příchovice, p. of Kořenov
Priedlanz: Předlánce, p. of Višňová (Liberec District)
Priesen:
Březno (Chomutov District)
Březno, p. of Postoloprty
Priesern: Přízeř, p. of Rožmberk nad Vltavou
Priesten (Pristen): Přestanov
Priethal: Přídolí
Primislau: Přibyslav
Primiswald: Přemyslov, p. of Loučná nad Desnou
Prisnitz: Přísečná
Pritschen: Příčná
Priwoz: Přívoz, p. of Ostrava
Probolden: Provodice, p. of Hořice na Šumavě
Proboscht: Proboštov, p. of Malečov
Probstau: Proboštov
Prochomuth: Prachomety, p. of Toužim
Pröding: Předín
Prödlas: Brodce, p. of Kadaň
Prödlitz:
Brodek u Prostějova
Předlice, p. of Ústí nad Labem
Prohn: Braňany
Prohor: Prohoř, p. of Štědrá
Pröles: Přílezy, p. of Útvina
Pröllas: Brody, p. of Krásný Dvůr
Promenhof: Broumov (Tachov District)
Prösau: Březová (Sokolov District)
Prosau: Mrázov, p. of Teplá
Prosanken: Brozánky, p. of Řehlovice
Proschwitz an der Neiße: Proseč nad Nisou, p. of Jablonec nad Nisou
Prosetsch: Proseč
Prositschka: Prosíčka, p. of Koberovy
Proskowitz: Proskovice, p. of Ostrava
Prosseln: Prosetín, p. of Dobkovice
Prossenitz: Prosenice
Prossmeritz: Prosiměřice
Prossnitz:
Prostějov
(Prosnitz): Vražice, now Boletice MTA (e)
Prostiowiczek: Prostějovičky
Protiwanow: Protivanov
Protiwin: Protivín
Protowitz: Protivec, p. of Žlutice
Prostibor: Prostiboř
Prstna: Prstná, p. of Petrovice u Karviné
Pruhonitz: Průhonice
Prünles: Studenec, p. of Oloví
Prusinowitz: Prusinovice
Prussinowitz: Ranošov, now Kozlov (Olomouc District) (e)
Przestawelk (Pschestawilk): Přestavlky (Přerov District)
Przikas (Pschikas): Příkazy
Pschan: Blšany u Loun
Pschelautsch: Přelouč
Pschestitz: Přeštice
Pschislowitz: Březovice
Pschiwosten: Přívozec, p. of Blížejov
Pschoblik: Pšovlky
Pstruschi: Pstruží
Ptin: Ptení
Pudageln: Budákov, p. of Dolní Dvořiště
Pudlau: Pudlov, p. of Bohumín
Puklitz: Puklice
Pulgram: Bulhary (Břeclav District)
Pulletschney: Pulečný
Pullitz: Police (Třebíč District)
Pullwitz: Pulovice, p. of Šemnice
Pulpetzen: Pulpecen
Pumperle: Řasnice, p. of Strážný
Punkendorf: Boňkov, p. of Olšovec
Punnau: Boněnov, p. of Chodová Planá
Pürgles: Hrádek, p. of Krajková
Pürglitz: Křivoklát
Pürkau: Tvrdkov
Purkratitz: Purkratice
Pürles: Brložec, p. of Štědrá
Pürstein: Perštejn
Pürstling: Březník, now Modrava
Puritschen: Kvasov, now Rožmitál na Šumavě (e)
Purschau: Pořejov, now Hošťka (e)
Pusch: Buč, p. of Bezvěrov
Puschwitz: Buškovice
Puskowetz: Pustkovec, p. of Ostrava
Pustimir (Pustomirz): Pustiměř
Putkau: Putkov, p. of Zdíkov
Putschirn: Počerny, p. of Karlovy Vary
Putzeried: Pocinovice
Putzlitz: Puclice
Pyschcz: Píšť (Opava District)

Q

Qualen: Chvalov, p. of Stebno
Qualisch: Chvaleč
Quetusch (Kwietusch): Květuš, p. of Chyšky
Quikau: Kvítkov, p. of Modlany
Quinau: Květnov, p. of Blatno (Chomutov District)
Quintenthal: Vizov, now Žacléř
Quitosching: Květušín, p. of Polná na Šumavě
Quittein: Květín, p. of Mohelnice
Quittendorf: Metylovice
Quitkau: Kvítkov

R

Raabe: Hrabová (Šumperk District)
Raase: Razová
Rabenhütte: Havránka, now Horní Vltavice (e)
Rabenseifen: Hraběšice
Rabenstein an der Schnella: Rabštejn nad Střelou, p. of Manětín
Rabenau: Hrabenov, p. of Ruda nad Moravou
Rabersdorf: Hrabišín
Rabitz: Hrabice, p. of Vimperk
Rabus: Raveň, p. of Střítež (Český Krumlov District)
Raby (Rabi): Rabí
Rachel: Rokle
Rad: Kluč, p. of Habartov
Radaun: Radouň, p. of Štětí
Radetitz: Radětice (Příbram District)
Radhoscht:
Radhošť (Ústí nad Orlicí District)
(Radegast): Radhošť (mountain)
Radigau: Radechov, p. of Radonice (Chomutov District)
Radikau: Radíkov, p. of Olomouc
Radimowitz:
Radimovice u Tábora
Radimovice u Želče
Radinetschlag: Radčice, p. of Malonty
Rading: Radyně, p. of Toužim
Radischen: Hradiště, p. of Kaplice
Radl: Rádlo
Radmühl: Radomilov, p. of Ruda nad Moravou
Radnitz:
Radnice
Radnice, p. of Pavlov (Šumperk District)
Radobil: Radobýl
Radomischl: Radomyšl
Radonitz: Radonice (Chomutov District)
Radoschowitz: Radošovice (České Budějovice District)
Radostin: Radostín, p. of Sychrov (Liberec District)
Radostitz: Radhostice
Radotin: Radotín, p. of Chyše
Radschau: Račov, p. of Zdíkov
Radschitz: Radčice
Radschowitz: Hradcovice
Radun: Raduň
Radwanitz:
Radvanice, p. of Ostrava
Radvanice, p. of Velhartice
Radzein: Radejčín, p. of Řehlovice
Ragersdorf: Malý Radkov, p. of Hartmanice (Klatovy District)
Rahmbruckhäuser: Manč
Raigern: Rajhrad
Rail: Rájec, p. of Přimda
Rainochowitz: Rajnochovice
Raitz: Rájec, p. of Borovnice (Rychnov nad Kněžnou District)
Raitza: Rájec, now Tisá
Rakonitz: Rakovník
Rakschitz: Rakšice
Rampusch: Rampuše
Ramsau: Ramzová, p. of Ostružná
Ranigsdorf: Linhartice
Rankwotz: Rankovice, p. of Teplá
Ranna: Raná (Chrudim District)
Ranzern: Rančířov
Rapitz: Vrapice, p. of Kladno
Rapotitz: Rapotice
Rappetschlag: Rapotice, p. of Malonty
Rascha: Rašov, p. of Klíny
Raschowitz: Rašovice, p. of Úštěk
Rasitz: Razice, p. of Hrobčice
Raspenau: Raspenava
Rasseln: Podskalí
Ratais an der Sasau (Rataj): Rataje nad Sázavou
Rathgebern: Radkov
Ratischkowitz: Ratíškovice
Ratiworz: Ratiboř, p. of Žlutice
Ratkau: Radkov (Opava District)
Ratsch: Hradiště, p. of Bžany (Teplice District)
Ratschendorf: Liberec XXXII-Radčice
Ratschin: Račín, now Boletice MTA (e)
Ratschitz (Ratschütz): Račice, p. of Račice-Pístovice
Ratschinowes: Raciněves
Rattai (Ratay): Rataje (Tábor District)
Rattay (Ratais): Rataje (Kroměříž District)
Rattay (Ratais an der Sasau): Rataje nad Sázavou
Rattimau: Vratimov
Ratzau:
Rácov, p. of Batelov
Racov, p. of Staré Sedlo (Tachov District)
Raubowitz: Hroubovice
Rauchowan (Rouchowan, Rochowann): Rouchovany
Raudnei: Roudný, p. of Frýdštejn
Raudnig: Roudníky, p. of Chabařovice
Raudnitz:
Roudnice
Roudnice, p. of Jestřabí v Krkonoších
(an der Elbe): Roudnice nad Labem
Rauhenschlag: Chlupatá Ves, p. of Horní Stropnice
Raunek: Rounek, p. of Vyskytná nad Jihlavou
Rauschenbach im Kaiserwald: Sítiny, p. of Mnichov (Cheb District)
Rauschengrund: Šumná, p. of Litvínov
Rausen: Rusín
Rausenbruck: Strachotice
Rausenstein: Ostrý Kámen, p. of Karle (Svitavy District)
Rausinow: Rousínov, p. of Slabce
Rautenberg: Roudno
Reckerberg: Popelná, p. of Nicov
Redenitz: Radnice, now Hradiště MTA (e)
Regens: Řehořov, p. of Kamenice (Jihlava District)
Regersdorf: Borek, p. of Zahrádky (Česká Lípa District)
Rehberg:
Liberk
Srní
Reichen: Rychnov, p. of Verneřice
Reichenau:
Rychnov na Moravě
Rychnov u Jablonce nad Nisou
Reichenau an der Knieschna: Rychnov nad Kněžnou
Reichenau an der Maltsch: Rychnov nad Malší, p. of Dolní Dvořiště
Reichenberg: Liberec
Reichenburg: Rychmburk
Reichetschlag, zu Schöbersdorf: Mýtina
Reichenthal: Hraničky, now Rozvadov (e)
Reichersdorf: Hradiště, p. of Cheb
Reichstadt: Zákupy
Reichwaldau: Rychvald
Reiditz: Rejdice, p. of Kořenov
Reifmaß: Radvanov, now Vyšší Brod (e)
Reigelsdorf: Rudíkovy, p. of Třemešná
Reigersdorf:
Rejchartice
Rejchartice, p. of Dvorce (Bruntál District)
Reihwiesen: Rejvíz, p. of Zlaté Hory
Reimlich: Rybí
Reindlitz: Ryjice
Reinowitz: Rýnovice, p. of Jablonec nad Nisou
Reischdorf: Rusová, p. of Kryštofovy Hamry (e)
Reisendorf: Trhavice, p. of Norberčany
Reissig: Klest, p. of Cheb
Reitenhau: Rejhotice, p. of Loučná nad Desnou
Reitendorf: Rapotín
Reiterschlag: Pasečná, now Přední Výtoň
Reith:
Kleštín, now Vyšší Brod (e)
Loutka, now Boletice MTA (e)
Svánkov, now Světlík (e)
Reitschowes: Radíčeves, p. of Žatec
Remeschin: Řemešín
Rennersdorf: Rynartice, p. of Jetřichovice
Rentsch: Řevničov
Repan (Rzepan): Řepany, p. of Lubenec
Repeschin: Řepešín, p. of Záblatí (Prachatice District)
Repschein: Řepčín, p. of Olomouc
Repin: Řepín
Repora: Prague-Řeporyje
Reschen: Rešov, p. of Horní Město
Reschihlau (Rescholau): Hrešihlavy
Reschwitz: Radošov, now Hradiště MTA
Retaun: Řetouň, p. of Malečov
Retschkowitz (Rzeckowitz): Brno-Řečkovice
Rettendorf: Kocbeře
Reutenhau: Rejtovice
Rewnitz: Řevnice
Richenburg: Předhradí
Richtarzow: Rychtářov, p. of Vyškov
Richterhäuser: Rychtářov, p. of Brloh (Český Krumlov District)
Richterhof: Střemily, now Boletice MTA (e)
Richtersdorf: Rychtářov, p. of Vyškov
Riegerschlag: Lodhéřov
Riegersdorf:
Modrá, p. of Jílové
Modřec, p. of Polička
Riehm: Hůrka, p. of Libá
Riesenberg:
Hrad Osek, p. of Osek (Teplice District)
Podzámčí, p. of Kdyně
Riesengebirge: Krkonoše (mountain range)
Rimau: Římov (České Budějovice District)
Rinaretz: Rynárec
Rindlau: Žlíbek, p. of Kašperské Hory
Rindles: Žlábek, p. of Horní Planá
Ringelberg: Horní Výšina, p. of Halže
Ringelsdorf: Kroužek, p. of Rousínov
Ringelshain: Rynoltice
Ringenhain: Větrov, p. of Frýdlant
Rippau: Řepová, p. of Mohelnice
Rischkau: Hříškov
Ritschan (Rzitschan, Rican): Říčany
Ritschen: Rýdeč, p. of Malečov
Rittersdorf: Rytířov, p. of Verneřice
Rittersgrün: Nová Kyselka, p. of Kyselka
Riwtschitz: Hrivčice
Robesgrün: Radvanov, p. of Josefov (Sokolov District)
Robitsch: Robeč, p. of Úštěk
Rockendorf: Žitná
Roche: Rochov, p. of Úštěk
Röchlitz: Liberec VI-Rochlice
Rochlitz an der Iser: Rokytnice nad Jizerou
Röderhof: Rodrovský Dvorec
Rodisfort: Radošov, p. of Kyselka
Rodowitz: Radvanec
Rodwald: Krčín, p. of Nové Město nad Metují
Rogau: Velký Radkov, p. of Rejštejn
Rohatetz: Rohatec
Rohle: Rohle
Rohn: Leptač
Rohr: Nový Drahov, p. of Třebeň
Rohrbach: Hrušovany u Brna
Röhrenberg: Žlíbky, p. of Horní Vltavice (e)
Röhrenbergerhütte: Samoty, now Horní Vltavice (e)
Röhrsdorf:
Liščí, p. of Lipová (Děčín District)
Svor
Rohow: Rohov (Opava District)
Roiden: Rojov, now Rožmitál na Šumavě (e)
Roisching: Rojšín, p. of Brloh (Český Krumlov District)
Roisko (Roysko): Rajsko, p. of Dlouhá Ves (Klatovy District)
Rojau:
Rájov, p. of Mnichov (Cheb District)
Rájov, p. of Zlatá Koruna
Roketnitz: Rokytnice u Přerova
Rokitnitz in Adlergebirge: Rokytnice v Orlických horách
Rokitzan (Rokytzan): Rokycany
Rolessengrün: Návrší, p. of Tuřany (Cheb District)
Rom: Kladky
Römerstadt: Rýmařov
Rommersreuth: Skalka, p. of Hazlov
Rongstock: Roztoky, p. of Povrly
Ronow an der Doubrawa (Ronau): Ronov nad Doubravou
Ronsperg: Poběžovice
Roppitz: Ropice
Rosawitz: Děčín V-Rozbělesy
Roschitz: Rosice, p. of Cerekvička-Rosice
Roschnow: Rožnov (Náchod District)
Roschowitz: Radošovice (České Budějovice District)
Roschtin: Roštín
Rosenau: Rožnov, p. of Český Rudolec
Rosenau unter dem Radhoscht: Rožnov pod Radhoštěm
Rosenberg: Rožmberk nad Vltavou
Rosendorf: Růžová
Rosenhain: Rožany, p. of Šluknov
Rosenhügel: Růžový Vrch, now Přední Výtoň (e)
Rosenthal:
Rožmitál, p. of Broumov
Rožmitál, p. of Zlaté Hory
Rožmitál pod Třemšínem
Růžodol, p. of Litvínov
Liberec XI-Růžodol I
Vrchoslav, p. of Krupka
Rosenthal im Böhmerwald: Rožmitál na Šumavě
Rosinkau: Nový Hrozenkov
Rositz: Rosice (Chrudim District)
Roßbach: Hranice (Cheb District)
Roßboden: Rozpoutí, p. of Kaplice
Rossenreuth: Mýtinka, p. of Vojtanov
Rosshaupt: Rozvadov
Rössin: Řešín, p. of Bezdružice
Rossitz: Rosice
Roßmeisl: Horní Rozmyšl, p. of Dolní Nivy
Roßnitz: Rosnice, p. of Karlovy Vary
Rossochatetz: Rozsochatec
Rossrein: Rozhrani M,2
Roßwald: Slezské Rudoltice
Rosternitz: Rostěnice, p. of Rostěnice-Zvonovice
Rosternitz-Swonowitz: Rostěnice-Zvonovice
Rostok:
Roztoky (Prague-West District)
Roztoky (Rakovník District)
Roztoky, p. of Šestajovice (Náchod District)
Roztoky u Jilemnice
Roztoky u Semil
Roteneck: Červená, p. of Letohrad
Rothau: Rotava
Rothaujezd: Červený Újezd, p. of Hrobčice
Rothenbaum: Červené Dřevo, now Chudenín
Rothenburg: Červený Hrádek
Rothengrund: Červený Důl, p. of Uhelná
Rothenhof: Červený Dvůr, p. of Chvalšiny
Rothenkreuz: Červený Kříž, p. of Jihlava
Roth Janowitz: Červené Janovice
Rothkosteletz: Červený Kostelec
Roth Lhotta: Červená Lhota
Rothmühl: Radiměř
Rothrecitz (Roth Retschitz): Červená Řečice
Rothsaifen: Červená, p. of Kašperské Hory
Rotkirchen: Líbeznice
Rotschau: Ročov
Roubovice: Hroubovice
Rouschtka: Rouštka M,31
Rowetschin: Rovečné
Rowensko bei Turnau: Rovensko pod Troskami
Rowenz: Rovensko (Šumperk District)
Röwersdorf: Třemešná
Rownin: Rovniny
Roy: Ráj, p. of Karviná
Rozdalowitz: Rožďalovice
Ruben: Kladenské Rovné, p. of Kájov
Rubenz: Rovence
Ruckendorf: Hrudkov, p. of Vyšší Brod
Rudelsdorf:
Rudolice, p. of Most
Rudolice v Horách, p. of Hora Svaté Kateřiny
Rudoltice
Rudoltice, p. of Sobotín
Rudelzau: Rudoltovice, now Libavá MTA (e)
Ruden: Roudné
Rudetschlag: Lipoltov
Rudig: Vroutek
Rudikau: Rudíkov
Ruditzgrün: Rudolec, p. of Březová (Sokolov District)
Rudolfstadt: Rudolfov
Rudolfsthal: Liberec XXI-Rudolfov
Rückersdorf: Dolní Řasnice
Rumburg: Rumburk
Ruppelsgrün: Ruprechtov, p. of Hroznětín
Ruppersdorf: Liberec XIV-Ruprechtice
Ruprecht: Ruprechtov
Rzikowitz (Rikowitz): Říkovice
Rzimau: Římov (Třebíč District)

S

Saap: Zápy
Saar:
Žďár nad Sázavou
Žďár, now Hradiště MTA (e)
Saara: Žďár, p. of Velké Chvojno
Saatz: Žatec (Jihlava District)
Saaz: Žatec
Sablat: Záblatí (Prachatice District)
Sablath: Záblatí, p. of Bohumín
Sabnitz: Saběnice, p. of Havraň
Sabor (Saborsch): Záboří (České Budějovice District)
Sabortsch: Záborčí, p. of Malá Skála
Sacherles: Kamenná (České Budějovice District)
Sachradka: Zahrádky
Sachrob: Záhrobí, p. of Bělčice
Sachsenthal: Sasov, p. of Jihlava
Sadowa: Sadová
Sadschitz: Zaječice, p. of Vrskmaň
Sadska: Sadská
Saduba: Zádub, p. of Olbramov
Sadusch: Mělník
Sahaj: Zahájí
Sahor: Záhořice, p. of Žlutice
Sahorkowitz: Záhorkovice, p. of Mojné
Sahorsch:
Záhoří (Semily District)
Záhoří, p. of Žim
Sahorschan: Záhořany
Sahr: Ždár
Sahrad: Zahrádka, p. of Teplá
Saidschitz: Zaječice, p. of Bečov
Saitz: Zaječí
Sajestetz: Zájezdec
Salbnuß: Dolní Sukolom, p. of Uničov
Salcperk (Salzberg): Bílá Skála
Salesel (Salesl):
Dolní Zálezly
Horní Zálezly, p. of Malečov
Zálezly, p. of Skapce
Salisfeld: Salisov, p. of Zlaté Hory
Salluschen: Záluží, p. of Dolní Třebonín
Salmdorf: Salmov, p. of Mikulášovice
Salmthal: Pstruží, p. of Merklín (Karlovy Vary District)
Salnau: Želnava
Saluschan: Zalužany
Salzergut: Nový Svět, p. of Olomouc
Salzweg: Solná Lhota, p. of Vimperk
Samost: Zámostí
Samrsk: Zámrsk
Sand Lhota: Písková Lhota (Nymburk District)
Sandau:
Dolní Žandov
Píšť (Opava District)
Žandov
Sandhübel: Písečná (Jeseník District)
Sandl: Písečná, p. of Litvínov
Sangerberg (Songerberg): Prameny
Sankt Anna:
Svatá Anna, p. of Horšovský Týn
Svatá Anna, p. of Oslov
Svatá Anna, p. of Vlčeves
Sankt Georgenthal: Jiřetín pod Jedlovou
Sankt Joachimsthal: Jáchymov
Sankt Johann ob Skrejschow: Svatý Jan
Sankt Johann unter dem Felsen: Svatý Jan pod Skalou
Sankt Katharina: Svatá Kateřina, p. of Rozvadov
Sankt Katharinaberg: Hora Svaté Kateřiny
Sankt Magdalena: Svatá Maří
Sankt Niklas: Svatý Mikuláš
Sankt Sebastiansberg: Hora Svatého Šebestiána
Sankt Thomas: Svatý Tomáš, now Přední Výtoň
Sarau (Sarrau): Kyselov, now Vyšší Brod
Sasau (Sazau):
Sázava (Benešov District)
Sázava (Žďár nad Sázavou District)
Saschau: Zašová
Sasmuk: Zásmuky
Sassadel: Zásada
Satkau: Sádek, p. of Deštnice
Sattel: Sedlo, p. of Útvina
Sattelberg: Sedlo, now Srní
Satteles: Sedlečko, p. of Šemnice
Saubernitz: Zubrnice
Saubsdorf: Supíkovice
Sauersack: Rolava, now Přebuz (e)
Sawerschitz: Zavržice, p. of Příbram
Sawersdorf: Závišice
Sazau (Sasau):
Sázava (Benešov District)
Sázava (Žďár nad Sázavou District)
Sbiroch: Zbirohy, p. of Koberovy
Sbirow: Zbiroh
Sborau: Zborovy
Sborowitz: Zborovice
Sbosch: Zboží, p. of Habry
Sbraslaus: Zbraslav (Brno-Country District)
Sbraslawitz: Zbraslavice
Schaar: Žďár (Rakovník District)
Schaben: Šabina
Schaboglück: Žabokliky, p. of Nové Sedlo (Louny District)
Schabowres: Žabovřesky (České Budějovice District)
Schachersdorf: Šachotín, p. of Šlapanov
Schadlowitz: Žádlovice, p. of Loštice
Schäferei: Ovčárna, p. of Nová Bystřice
Schaffa: Šafov
Schafhütten: Rozcestí, p. of Rozvadov
Schak: Žáky
Schallan: Žalany
Schamers: Číměř
Schanda: Žandov, p. of Chlumec (Ústí nad Labem District)
Schankau: Čankov, p. of Karlovy Vary
Schanz: Valy (Cheb District)
Schanzendorf: Valy, p. of Krompach
Schärfenberg: Ostrá Hora, p. of Bohušov
Scharoschitz: Žarošice
Schaßlowitz: Častolovice, p. of Česká Lípa
Schattau: Šatov
Schattawa: Zátoň, p. of Lenora (Prachatice District)
Schatzlar: Žacléř
Schaub: Pšov
Schauflern: Šafléřov, now Malšín (e)
Schdiar (Zdiar):
Žďár (Blansko District)
Žďár (Jindřichův Hradec District)
Žďár (Mladá Boleslav District)
Žďár (Písek District)
Schebetau: Šebetov
Scheer: Žďárek, p. of Chyše
Schehuschitz: Žehušice
Scheibelsdorf (Scheibeldorf): Okrouhlička
Scheiben:
Šejby, p. of Horní Stropnice
Vyšovatka, p. of Buk (Prachatice District)
Scheibenraditsch: Okrouhlé Hradiště, p. of Konstantinovy Lázně
Scheibenreuth: Okrouhlá (Cheb District)
Scheles: Žihle
Schelesen: Želízy
Scheletz: Želeč, p. of Malá Skála
Schelkowitz bei Bilin: Želkovice
Schellenken: Želénky, p. of Zabrušany
Schelletau: Želetava
Schelsnitz: Přelštice, p. of Kájov
Schemeslitz: Všemyslice
Schemmel: Všemily, p. of Jetřichovice
Schenkenhahn: Tesařov, now Kořenov
Schepankowitz: Štěpánkovice
Scheranowitz: Žeranovice
Scherawitz: Žeravice (Hodonín District)
Scherzdorf: Heltínov, p. of Luboměř
Schestau: Žestov, now Hořice na Šumavě
Scheuereck: Stodůlky, now Strážný (e)
Schewetin: Ševětín
Schichhof (Schichow): Žichov, p. of Měrunice
Schichowitz: Žichovice
Schidowitz:
Židovice (Jičín District)
Židovice (Litoměřice District)
Schiedel: Šidlov, p. of Zákupy
Schiedowitz: Židovice, p. of Libčeves
Schieferhütte: Břidlová, now Šindelová (e)
Schießnetitz: Žíznětice, p. of Dešenice
Schießnig: Žizníkov, p. of Česká Lípa
Schichlitz: Žichlice, now Modlany (e)
Schihobetz: Žihobce
Schild: Bystrá, now Vyšší Brod (e)
Schillerberg: Radvanovice
Schildberg: Štíty
Schillersdorf: Šiherovice
Schiltern: Štítary
Schima: Žim
Schimern: Všímary, now Malšín
Schimitz: Brno-Židenice
Schimmelsdorf: Pohořílky, p. of Fulnek
Schindelhöf: Šindlovy Dvory, p. of Litvínovice
Schindlau: Šindlov, p. of Borová Lada
Schindlwald: Šindelová
Schinkau: Žinkovy
Schippen: Šípy
Schiretz (Ziretz): Žírec, p. of Zdíkov
Schirmdorf: Semanín
Schirnik: Žernovník, p. of Bezvěrov
Schlackenwerth (Schlakenwerth): Ostrov (Karlovy Vary District)
Schlackern, zu Mugrau: Slavkovice
Schlada: Slatina, p. of Františkovy Lázně
Schlag am Rossberg: Čižkrajice pod Chobolkou, now Vyšší Brod (e)
Schlagl: Šavlova Lhota, now Boletice MTA (e)
Schlaggenwald: Horní Slavkov
Schlakau: Slavkov (Opava District)
Schlan (Salzberg): Slaný
Schlapanitz (Schlappanitz): Šlapanice
Schlappenz: Šlapanov
Schlatten: Slatina (Nový Jičín District)
Schlausewitz: Služovice
Schleb: Žleby
Schlesien: Slezsko
Schlesisch Kotzendorf: Slezský Kočov, p. of Moravskoslezský Kočov
Schlesisch Ostrau: Slezská Ostrava, p. of Ostrava
Schlesisch Hartau: Slezská Harta, p. of Leskovec nad Moravicí
Schlief: Zliv, p. of Planá (Tachov District)
Schlock: Slavkov, p. of Kozlov (Olomouc District)
Schlögelsdorf: Šléglov
Schlösschen: Zámeček
Schlossbösig: Bezděz
Schlösselbach: Kořenný, p. of Strážný
Schlösselwald: Hrádky
Schluckenau: Šluknov
Schlumnitz: Slubice, p. of Bohdalovice
Schlüsselburg: Lnáře
Schmalzgruben: Nemaničky, p. of Nemanice
Schmeil: Smilov, now Libavá MTA (e)
Schmidles: Smilov, p. of Toužim
Schmiedeberg: Kovářská
Schmiedhäuser: Kovářov, p. of Brloh (Český Krumlov District)
Schmieding: Kovářovice, now Boletice MTA (e)
Schmiedsau: Kovářov, p. of Potštát
Schmiedschlag: Kovářov, p. of Frymburk
Schmolau: Smolov, p. of Bělá nad Radbuzou
Schmole: Zvole (Šumperk District)
Schnauhübel: Sněžná, p. of Krásná Lípa
Schnecken: Šneky
Schneckendorf: Hlemýždí, p. of Brniště
Schneeberg: Sněžník, p. of Jílové
Schneekoppe: Sněžka (mountain)
Schneppendorf: Sluková, p. of Valkeřice
Schneiderschlag: Krejčovice, now Volary
Schneidetschlag: Veselí, now Boletice MTA (e)
Schneidmühl: Pila (Karlovy Vary District)
Schnobolin: Slavonín, p. of Olomouc
Schoberstätten, zu Christianberg: Seníky
Schöbersdorf: Šebanov
Schöbritz: Všebořice, p. of Ústí nad Labem
Schobrowitz: Všeborovice, p. of Dalovice (Karlovy Vary District)
Schöllschitz: Želešice
Schömern: Všeměry, p. of Přídolí
Schömersdorf: Všeměřice, p. of Dolní Dvořiště
Schömitz: Šemnice
Schönau:
Činov, p. of Doupovské Hradiště
Krásensko
Loučky, p. of Verneřice
Pěkná, p. of Nová Pec
Šanov, p. of Červená Voda (Ústí nad Orlicí District)
Šenov u Nového Jičína
Sněžná, p. of Kraslice
Šonov
Schönbach: Luby (Cheb District)
Schönbach:
(bei Asch): Krásná (Cheb District)
Meziboří
Zdislava (Liberec District)
Schönberg: Krásná Hora
Schönborn:
Děčín XXIV-Krásný Studenec
Liberec XXXI-Krásná Studánka
Stráž u České Lípy, p. of Stružnice
Studánka, p. of Varnsdorf
Schönbrunn:
Dolní Studénky
Jedlová
Studánka
Svinov, p. of Ostrava
Schönbüchel: Krásný Buk, p. of Krásná Lípa
Schönfeld:
Krásná Pole, now Loučovice (e)
Krásné Pole, p. of Chřibská
Krásné Pole, p. of Ostrava
Krásno (Sokolov District)
Schönfelden: Osí, now Boletice MTA (e)
Schönficht: Smrkovec, now Březová (Sokolov District) (e)
Schönhengst: Hřebec
Schönhof:
Krásný Dvůr
Šenov
Schönichel: Šunychl, p. of Bohumín
Schönlind: Krásná Lípa, p. of Šindelová
Schönlinde: Krásná Lípa
Schöninger (mountain): Kleť
Schönpriesen: Krásné Březno, p. of Ústí nad Labem
Schönstein: Dolní Životice
Schönthal:
Krásné, p. of Tři Sekery
Krásné Údolí
Schonung: Obora u Loun
Schönwald:
Krásný Les (Karlovy Vary District)
Krásný Les (Liberec District)
Krásný Les, p. of Petrovice (Ústí nad Labem District)
Lesná (Tachov District)
Podlesí, now Bartošovice v Orlických horách
Podlesí, p. of Budišov nad Budišovkou
Strážná
Šumná
Šumvald
Schönwehr: Krásný Jez, p. of Bečov nad Teplou
Schönwerth: Krásná, p. of Kraslice
Schönwiese: Krásné Loučky, p. of Krnov
Schoschuwka: Šošůvka
Schossendorf: Radeč, p. of Žandov
Schossenreith: Částkov (Tachov District)
Schößl: Všestudy
Schreckenstein: Střekov, p. of Ústí nad Labem
Schreibendorf: Písařov
Schreiberseifen: Skrbovice, p. of Široká Niva
Schreibersdorf: Hněvošice
Schreinetschlag: Skříněřov
Schrikowitz: Křepkovice, p. of Teplá
Schrittenz: Střítež (Jihlava District)
Schröbersdorf: Radešov, p. of Rejštejn
Schröffelsdorf: Nová Dědina, p. of Uničov
Schukatschen: Šukačka, now Čachrov
Schumbarg: Šumbark, p. of Havířov
Schumberg: Žumberk
Schumburg: Krásná, p. of Pěnčín (Jablonec nad Nisou District)
Schumburg an der Desse: Šumburk nad Desnou, p. of Tanvald
Schumitz: Šumice (Uherské Hradište District)
Schüppen: Šípy
Schurz: Žireč, p. of Dvůr Králové nad Labem
Schusitz: Žehušice
Schüttenhofen: Sušice
Schüttenitz: Žitenice
Schützendorf: Slavoňov, p. of Lukavice (Šumperk District)
Schutzengel: Anděl Strážce, p. of Frýdštejn
Schwaben: Šváby, p. of Zahrádky (Česká Lípa District)
Schwabenitz: Švábenice
Schwabitz: Svébořice, p. of Ralsko
Schwaden: Svádov, p. of Ústí nad Labem
Schwaderbach: Bublava
Schwadowitz, Klein-Schwadowitz: Malé Svatoňovice
Schwalben: Vlastějov, p. of Hartmanice (Klatovy District)
Schwanenberg: Labutice, p. of Suchdol (Prostějov District)
Schwanenbrückl: Mostek, p. of Rybník (Domažlice District) (e)
Schwansdorf: Svatoňovice
Schwarzbuda: Černé Budy
Schwarzbach: Černá v Pošumaví
Schwarzenbach:
Černava
Černá, p. of Kraslice
Schwarzenberg: Černá Hora (Blansko District)
Schwarzenthal: Černý Důl
Schwarzes Kreuz: Černí Kříž
Schwarzhaid: Černá Lada, p. of Borová Lada
Schwarzkirchen: Ostrovačice
Schwarzkosteletz: Kostelec nad Černými lesy
Schwarzpfütze (Schwarze Pfütze): Jítrava, p. of Rynoltice
Schwarzthal: Černé Údolí, p. of Benešov nad Černou
Schwarzwasser:
Černá Voda
Černá Voda, now Orlické Záhoří
Schwaz: Světec
Schweine: Janoslavice, p. of Rohle
Schweinetschlag: Sviňovice
Schweinitz:
Sviny (Tábor District)
Trhové Sviny
Schweinschädel: Svinišťany, p. of Dolany (Náchod District)
Schweissing: Svojšín
Schwetz: Bedřichův Světec, p. of Bělušice (Most District)
Schwiebgrub: Svíba, now Boletice MTA (e)
Schwihau: Švihov (Klatovy District)
Schwinau: Svinov, p. of Útvina
Schwillbogen: Svébohov
Schwindschitz: Svinčice, p. of Lužice (Most District)
Schwitz: Světec, p. of Bezvěrov
Sdaslaw: Zdeslav
Sdechowitz: Zdechovice (Pardubice District)
Sdenitz: Zdenice, p. of Nebahovy
Sdeslaw: Zdeslav
Sdiar: Ždár
Sdounek: Zdounky
Sduchowitz: Zduchovice
Sebastiansberg: Hora Svatého Šebestiána
Sebenbach: Chvoječná, p. of Cheb
Sebranitz:
Sebranice (Blansko District)
Sebranice (Svitavy District)
Sebrowitz: Brno-Žabovřesky
Sebusein: Sebuzín, p. of Ústí nad Labem
Seckerberg: Horky
Sedletz:
Sedlec (Litoměřice District)
Sedlec (Mladá Boleslav District)
Sedlec (Plzeň-North District)
Sedlec (Prague-East District)
Sedlec (Třebíč District)
Sedlec, p. of Kutná Hora
Sedlec, p. of Sedlec-Prčice
Sedlec, p. of Vraclav
Sedlitz:
Sedlice (Strakonice District)
Sedlice, p. of Korozluky
Sedlice, p. of Přídolí
Sedlmin: Sedlmín, now Prachatice (e)
Sedlnitz: Sedlnice
Sedlowitz: Sedlejovice, p. of Sychrov (Liberec District)
Seeberg: Ostroh, p. of Poustka
Seehaid: Svinná Lada, p. of Borová Lada
Seelau:
Želina, p. of Rokle
Želiv
Seelenz: Ždírec (Jihlava District)
Seelowitz: Židlochovice
Seesitz: Žežice, p. of Chuderov
Seestadtl: Ervěnice
Seewiesen: Javorná, p. of Čachrov
Segen Gottes: Zastávka
Sehrlenz: Ždírec (Havlíčkův Brod District)
Sehuschitz: Žehušice
Seibelsdorf: Žipotín, p. of Gruna
Seichenreuth: Táborská, p. of Hazlov
Seidenschwanz: Vrkoslavice, p. of Jablonec nad Nisou
Seifen: Ryžovna, p. of Boží Dar
Seifenbach: Ryžoviště, p. of Harrachov
Seifersdorf: Zátor
Seitendorf:
Hladké Životice
Horní Životice
Životice u Nového Jičína
Selcan (Seltschan): Sedlčany
Selletitz:
Seletice, p. of Postoloprty
Želetice (Znojmo District)
Sellnitz: Želenice (Most District)
Selsen: Želivsko
Seltsch: Želeč, p. of Měcholupy (Louny District)
Selz:
(Selze): Sedlec (České Budějovice District)
Sedlec, p. of Křešice
Prague-Sedlec
Semenkowitz: Seménkovice, p. of Postoloprty
Semeschitz: Semošice, p. of Horšovský Týn
Semil: Semily
Semitz: Semice
Semlowitz: Semněvice
Semtisch: Semtěš, p. of Pšov
Senftenberg: Žamberk
Senftleben: Ženklava
Senomat: Senomaty
Senoschat: Senožaty, p. of Bechyně
Sensemitz: Sezemice, p. of Rtyně nad Bílinou
Serbitz: Srbice (Teplice District)
Serles: Záhoří, p. of Verušičky
Serowitz (Serownitz): Žirovnice
Sestronowitz: Sestroňovice, p. of Frýdštejn
Setsch: Seč
Settenz: Řetenice, p. of Teplice
Setzdorf: Vápenná
Sezemitz (Sesemitz):
Sezemice (Mladá Boleslav District)
Sezemice (Pardubice District)
Sichelbach: Blato, p. of Nová Bystřice
Sicheritz: Čichořice, p. of Chyše
Sichlau: Čichalov
Sichrow: Sychrov (Liberec District)
Siebenhäuser:
Sedm Chalup, p. of Brloh (Český Krumlov District)
Sedmidomí, now Velké Svatoňovice
Sedmidomí, now Zbytiny
Siebenhöfen: Sedm Dvorů, p. of Moravský Beroun
Siebentann: Simtany, p. of Pohled (Havlíčkův Brod District)
Siebitz:
Třebovice, now Boletice MTA (e)
Třebovice, p. of Ktiš
Siegertsau: Zigartice, now Libavá MTA (e)
Siehdichfür: Hleďsebe, p. of Bělá nad Radbuzou
Siertsch: Ždírec (Česká Lípa District)
Siertschgrund: Ždírecký Důl, p. of Ždírec (Česká Lípa District)
Silberbach: Stříbrná
Silberberg:
Orlovice, p. of Pocinovice
Stříbrné Hory, p. of Nalžovské Hory
Stříbrné Hutě, now Pohorská Ves (e)
Silbersgrün: Háj, p. of Jindřichovice (Sokolov District)
Silberskalitz: Stříbrná Skalice
Siluwka: Silůvky
Simmensdorf: Šimanov
Simmersdorf: Smrčná
Sinzendorf: Velká Ves, p. of Bor (Tachov District)
Sirb: Srby (Domažlice District)
Sirmitz: Žirovice, p. of Františkovy Lázně
Sirnin: Srnín
Sittmesgrün: Mezirolí, p. of Nová Role
Sittna: Sytno
Sitzgras: Cizkrajov
Skalken: Podbřeží
Skirschina: Skršín
Skocitz: Skočice
Skretschon: Skřečoň, p. of Bohumín
Skrezipp (Skripp): Skřipov
Skridla: Skřidla, p. of Velešín
Skrischow: Skrýšov, p. of Polná
Skrochowitz: Skrochovice, p. of Brumovice (Opava District)
Skuchrow an der Alba: Skuhrov nad Bělou
Skupitz: Skupice, p. of Postoloprty
Skupsch: Skupeč, p. of Pernarec
Skutsch (Skuc): Skuteč
Skworetz: Škvorec
Slabathen: Slavětín
Slabetz: Slabce
Slabisch: Slavošov, p. of Povrly
Slap: Slapy, p. of Frýdštejn
Slatinan: Slatiňany
Slatnik (Zlatnik): Zlatníky, p. of Opava
Slaup: Sloup (Blansko District)
Slawietin:
Slavětín (Louny District)
Slavětín (Olomouc District)
(an der Mettau): Slavětín nad Metují
Slawitsch: Hranice VII-Slavíč 
Slawitschin: Slavičín
Slawoschowitz: Slavošovice, p. of Bolešiny
Slibowitz: Slibovice, p. of Běrunice
Sliw: Zliv
Slizan: Slížany, p. of Morkovice-Slížany
Slonin: Zlonín
Slonitz: Zlonice
Sloupnitz: Sloupnice
Sluschowitz: Slušovice
Smerdow: Sázavka
Smerhau: Smrhov, p. of Soběnov
Smerschowitz: Smržovice, p. of Kdyně
Smetschno (Smeczno, Smeczna): Smečno
Smidar: Smidary
Smilau: Smilov, p. of Štoky
Smiler Berg: Smilovy Hory
Smilkau: Smilkov
Smiritz (Smirzitz, Smirschitz): Smiřice
Smolkau: Smolkov, p. of Háj ve Slezsku
Smrdov: Sázavka
Smrzitz in Mähren: Smrzice M,23
Sniehow: Sněhov, p. of Malá Skála
Sobeslau (Sobieslau): Soběslav
Sobiechleb: Soběchleby
Sobiesak: Soběsuky, p. of Chbany
Sobieschitz: Soběšice
Sobietitz:
Sobětice, p. of Klatovy
Sobětice, p. of Žimutice
Sobochleben: Soběchleby, p. of Krupka
Soborten: Sobědruhy, p. of Teplice
Sobrusan: Zabrušany
Socherl: Suchohrdly u Miroslavi
Sodau: Sadov
Söhle: Žilina, p. of Nový Jičín
Sohors: Žár
Sohorz: Žďár, p. of Kaplice
Sokolnitz: Sokolnice
Solan: Solany
Soletin, also: Solletin, zu Repeschin: Saladin
Solislau: Sulislav
Sollan: Solany
Sollmus: Žalmanov, p. of Stružná
Sollowitz: Salavice, p. of Třešť
Solnitz: Solnice
Sonnberg:
Slunečná, p. of Želnava
Žumberk, p. of Žár
Sonnenberg: Výsluní
Sophienhain: Žofín, p. of Horní Podluží
Sophienthal: Černá Řeka, p. of Klenčí pod Čerchovem
Sorghof: Lučina, now Milíře (e)
Sörgsdorf: Uhelná
Sosen: Zásada u Kadaně, p. of Kadaň
Soutitz: Soutice B,3
Spachendorf: Leskovec nad Moravicí
Spansdorf: Lipová, p. of Chuderov
Springenberg: Pomezí, p. of Všeruby (Domažlice District)
Sepekau: Sepekov
Speierling: Skviřín, p. of Bor (Tachov District)
Spiegelhütten: Zrcadlova Huť
Spieglitz: Nová Seninka, p. of Staré Město (Šumperk District)
Spiels: Splž
Spillendorf: Oborná
Spilsow: Splzov, p. of Železný Brod
Spindlermühle (Spindelmühle): Špindlerův Mlýn
Spirkenhäusel: U Špirků
Spitinau: Spytihněv (Zlín District)
Spittelgrund: Dolní Sedlo, p. of Hrádek nad Nisou
Spittengrün: Nivy, p. of Děpoltovice
Spitzberg:
Chýšky, p. of Chyše
Špičák, p. of Železná Ruda
Spitzenberg: Hory, p. of Horní Planá
Spomischl: Spomyšl
Sponau: Spálov
Sporitz: Spořice
Spornhau: Ostružná
Srutsch an der Sasau: Zruč nad Sázavou
Staab: Stod
Stablowitz: Štáblovice
Stabnitz: Stebnice, p. of Lipová (Cheb District)
Stachau: Stachy
Stachenwald: Stachovice, p. of Fulnek
Stachlowitz: Štachlovice, now Vidnava
Staditz: Stadice, p. of Řehlovice
Stadl (Stadtl): Stodola, now Františkovy Lázně
Stadlern: Stádla, p. of Prachatice
Stadln: Stodůlky (Stadla)
Stadthöfen: Štoutov, p. of Čichalov
Städtische Oed: Městská Lhotka, p. of Prachatice
Stadt Liebau: Město Libavá
Stahletz (Stachletz): Stádlec
Stallek: Stálky
Stangendorf: Vendolí
Stankau:
Staňkov (Domažlice District)
Staňkov (Jindřichův Hradec District)
Stankowitz:
Staňkovice (Kutná Hora District)
Staňkovice (Litoměřice District)
Staňkovice (Louny District)
Stannern: Stonařov
Stanow: Stanový, p. of Zlatá Olešnice (Jablonec nad Nisou District)
Stanowitz: Stanovice, p. of Mariánské Lázně
Stänzelsdorf: Stanislavice, p. of Český Těšín
Staritsch (Starzitz): Staříč
Starkenbach: Jilemnice
Starkstadt: Stárkov
Starlitz: Starý Láz, p. of Nýrsko
Startsch: Stařeč
Starosedl: Starosedly, now Žalany
Starz: Starec, p. of Kdyně
Staschow: Stašov
Staudenz: Studenec, p. of Trutnov
Stauding: Studénka
Stechowitz: Štěchovice
Stecken: Štoky
Stekna (Steken): Štěkeň
Stedra: Štědrá
Stein:
Kámen, p. of Kraslice
Skalka, p. of Cheb
Stein im Böhmerwald: Polná na Šumavě
Steinau: Stonava
Stein Aujezd (Stein Augezd): Kamenný Újezd, p. of Nýřany
Steinbach:
Kamenice, p. of Březová (Sokolov District)
Květoňov, p. of Kaplice
Steindorf: Hubenov
Steine: Kamenná (Šumperk District)
Steingrub: Lomnička, p. of Plesná
Steingrün: Výhledy, p. of Hazlov
Steinhof: Kamenný Dvůr, p. of Kynšperk nad Ohří
Steinhübel: Kamenná Horka, p. of Krásná Lípa
Steinige Höhe: Kamenáč
Steinitz: Ždánice M,5
Steinitz: Uherský Ostroh
Steinkirchen: Kamenný Újezd B,10
Steinköpfl: Kamenná hlava
Stein Lhota: Kamenná Lhota
Steinmetz: Stavenice
Steinpöhl: Kamenná, p. of Krásná (Cheb District)
Steinschönau (Stein-Schönau): Kamenický Šenov
Steinsdorf:
Kámen (Havlíčkův Brod District)
Kamenec, p. of Jílové
Steinüberfuhr: Kamenný Přívoz
Steken (Stekna, Stiekna): Štěkeň
Stelzengrün: Stará Chodovská, p. of Chodov (Sokolov District)
Stengles: Kamenec, p. of Stráž nad Ohří
Stepanitz: Štěpanice, p. of Hartmanice (Klatovy District)
Stepanowitz: Štěpánovice (České Budějovice District)
Stephanau (Stefanau):
Horní Štěpánov
Štěpánov
Stephansruh: Příchovice, p. of Kořenov
Sterkowitz: Strkovice, p. of Postoloprty
Stern: Hvězda, now Loučovice (e)
Sternberg:
Český Šternberk
Šternberk
Stetkowitz: Štětkovice
Stettin: Štítina
Stezer (Stößer): Stěžery
Stiahlau: Šťáhlavy
Stiebenreith: Ctiboř (Tachov District)
Stiebnig: Jistebník
Stiebnitz: Zdobnice
Stiebrowitz: Stěbořice
Stiegesdorf: Zdíky, p. of Bujanov
Stieglhof: Stíhlov
Stieks: Štěkře, p. of Dolní Třebonín
Stienowitz: Štenovice
Stiepanau: Štěpánov nad Svratkou
Stiepanow: Štěpánov, p. of Lukov (Teplice District)
Stillfried: Víska, p. of Dětřichov (Svitavy District)
Stimmersdorf: Mezná, p. of Hřensko
Stittna: Štítná nad Vláří, p. of Štítná nad Vláří-Popov
Stipoklas: Štipoklasy
Stipp (Stiep): Štípa, p. of Zlín
Stirchlep: Krchleby, p. of Staňkov (Domažlice District)
Stitkau: Štítkov, p. of Svatá Maří
Stöben: Stebno
Stockau: Štokov, p. of Chodský Újezd
Stockau (b. Ronsperg): Pivoň
Stockern (near Luppetsching): Plíškov
Stöcken: Štoky
Stögenwald: Pestřice
Stögerhütte: Štégrova Huť
Stömnitz: Jistebník, now Rožmitál na Šumavě
Stojanowitz: Stojanovice, p. of Velhartice
Stolzenhain (Stolzenhann): Háj, p. of Loučná pod Klínovcem
Stolzenhan: Pyšná, p. of Vysoká Pec (Chomutov District)
Stoschitz: Stožice
Strachowitz: Strachovice, p. of Stráž (Tachov District)
Straden: Stradov, p. of Chlumec (Ústí nad Labem District)
Strahl: Střelná, p. of Košťany
Strahl Hoschtitz: Střelské Hoštice
Straka: Straky, p. of Zabrušany
Strakonitz: Strakonice
Stramberg: Štramberk
Strandorf: Strahovice
Stranik: Straník, p. of Nový Jičín
Strany (Stran): Strání
Straschitz: Strašice
Straschkau: Strážek
Straschkowitz: Strážkovice, p. of Malé Svatoňovice
Straßenau: Benešov, p. of Broumov
Straßnitz: Strážnice
Straupitz: Stroupeč
Straußnitz: Stružnice
Strazowitz (Straschowitz):
Strážovice
Strážovice, p. of Křečovice
Strážovice, p. of Mirotice
Strážovice, p. of Pačejov
Strechow (an der Sasau): [[Střechov nad Sázavou, p. of Trhový Štěpánov
Stredokluk: Středokluky
Streitseifen: Podlesí, now Potůčky
Strelitz: Střelice, p. of Uničov
Stremplowitz: Štemplovec, p. of Holasovice
Stresmir (Strezmier): Střezimíř
Strewelna: Střevelná, p. of Železný Brod
Strickerhäuser: Mýtiny, p. of Harrachov
Strietesch: Střítež nad Bečvou
Strilek (Strzilek): Střílky
Strisowitz: Střížovice, p. of Chlumec (Ústí nad Labem District)
Striter (Stritesch): Střítež (Pelhřimov District)
Stritschitz: Strýčice
Strobnitz: Horní Stropnice
Strodau: Stradov, p. of Omlenice
Stropnitz: Dolní Stropnice, p. of Římov (České Budějovice District)
Strokele: Strakov
Strunkowitz (an der Flanitz): Strunkovice nad Blanicí
Strups: Srubec
Strupschein: Strupšín, p. of Brníčko
Strutz: Troubsko
Strzebowitz: Třebovice, p. of Ostrava
Stubau: Dubová, p. of Přídolí
Stuben: Hůrka, p. of Horní Planá
Stubenbach: Prášily
Stubendorf: Studnice, now Osoblaha
Stubenseifen: Stříbrnice, p. of Staré Město (Šumperk District)
Studein: Studená (Jindřichův Hradec District)
Studenetz: Studenec (Semily District)
Studinke: Horní Studénky
Studnitz:
Studnice (Chrudim District)
Studnice (Náchod District)
Studnice (Třebíč District)
Studnice (Vyškov District)
Stüblern: Posudov, now Frymburk
Stübling: Žibřidov, now Dolní Dvořiště (e)
Studene: Studené
Stupna: Stupná, p. of Křemže
Stürbitz: Štrbice, p. of Světec
Subschitz: Zubčice
Subschitzer Mehlhüttel: Zubčická Lhotka, p. of Zubčice
Suchenthal:
Suchdol, p. of Bujanov
Suchdol nad Lužnicí
Suchey:
Suchá, p. of Stebno
Suché, p. of Modlany
Sucholasetz: Suché Lazce, p. of Opava
Sudomierschitz (Sudomieritz):
Sudoměřice
Sudoměřice u Bechyně
Sudoměřice u Tábora
Sukdol: Prague-Suchdol
Sukohrad: Sukorady, p. of Snědovice
Sulotitz: Suletice, p. of Homole u Panny
Suttom: Sutom, p. of Třebenice (Litoměřice District)
Swatkowitz: Svatkovice
Swetla (Swietla ob der Sasau): Světlá nad Sázavou
Swikowetz: Zvíkovec
Swinietitz: Svinětice, p. of Bavorov
Swinna: Svinná, p. of Čachrov
Swiretitz: Zvěřetice, p. of Babice (Prachatice District) 
Swittawka: Svitávka (Blansko District)
Swoboda: Svoboda, p. of Štěpánkovice
Swojanow: Svojanov
Swojschitz: Svojšice (Kolín District)
Swolenowes: Zvoleněves
Swonowitz: Zvonovice, p. of Rostěnice-Zvonovice
Swratka: Svratka (Žďár nad Sázavou District)
Swudschitz: Svučice, p. of Mišovice

T

Tabor:
Tábor
Tábor, p. of Velké Heraltice
Tacha: Tachov (Česká Lípa District)
Tachau: Tachov
Tachauer Brand: Milíře
Tachauer Schmelzthal: Tachovská Huť, p. of Tři Sekery
Tachlowitz: Tachlovice
Taikowitz: Tavíkovice
Tajanow: Tajanov
Tannawa: Ždánov
Tannaweg: Jedlová
Tannendorf (Tannendörfel): Jedlová, p. of Jiřetín pod Jedlovou
Tannwald: Tanvald
Taschendorf: Tošovice, p. of Odry
Taschow: Tašov
Taschwitz:
Horní Tašovice, p. of Stružná
Tašovice, p. of Karlovy Vary
Tassau: Tasov (Žďár nad Sázavou District)
Tassowitz: Tasovice (Blansko District)
Taßwitz: Tasovice (Znojmo District)
Tattenitz: Tatenice
Tattern (near Schöbersdorf): Tatry (Tatrov, Tetřiny)
Doubravice: Tauberwitz, p. of Homole u Panny
Taubnitz: Dubnice, p. of Lichnov (Bruntál District)
Taubrath: Doubrava, p. of Lipová (Cheb District)
Taus: Domažlice
Tauschim: Lázně Toušeň
Tauschkow: Touškov, p. of Mirovice
Taurau: Tourov, p. of Bavorov
Techlowitz: Těchlovice, p. of Stříbro
Teichhausen: Rybničná, p. of Bochov
Teichstatt: Rybniště
Teinitz an der Sasau: Týnec nad Sázavou
Teinitzl (Teinitzel):
Týnec (Klatovy District)
Týnec, p. of Chotěšov
Tellnitz: Telnice (Ústí nad Labem District)
Telnitz: Telnice (Brno-Country District)
Teltsch:
Teleč, p. of Bochov
Telč
Temnitz:
Těmice (Hodonín District)
Těmice (Pelhřimov District)
Tepl: Teplá
Tepl Stift: Klášter, p. of Teplá
Teplitz-Schönau (Teplitz): Teplice
Tereschau: Terešov, p. of Hlubočany
Teschau: Těšov, p. of Milíkov (Cheb District)
Teschen: Český Těšín
Teschetitz: Těšetice, p. of Bochov
Teschnitz: Deštnice
Teschnitzl: Tesnice
Teschwitz: Těšovice (Sokolov District)
Teslaven: Zdeslav
Tetschen (Tetschen-Bodenbach): Děčín
Tetschendorf: Tetčiněves, p. of Úštěk
Teutschenrust: Podbořanský Rohozec
Teutschmannsdorf: Skláře, p. of Hořice na Šumavě
Thaya (river): Dyje
Thein:
Týn nad Bečvou
Týn, p. of Lomnice (Sokolov District)
Týnec, p. of Planá (Tachov District)
Theresiendorf: Pohorská Ves
Theresienstadt: Terezín
Theresienthal: Terezín, p. of Petrov nad Desnou
Theusing: Toužim
Theußau: Tisová, p. of Březová (Sokolov District)
Thierbach: Suchá, p. of Nejdek
Thiergarten: Obora (Tachov District)
Tholl: Doly, p. of Bor (Tachov District)
Thomasdorf:
Domašov, p. of Bělá pod Pradědem
Tomášov, p. of Mikulášovice
Thomigsdorf: Damníkov
Thonbrunn: Studánka, p. of Hranice (Cheb District)
Thönischen: Týniště, p. of Verušičky
Thröm: Třebom
Thurmplandles: Věžovatá Pláně
Thurn: Tuřany (Cheb District)
Thusing: Toužín, p. of Dačice
Tichau: Tichá
Tichlowitz: Těchlovice (Děčín District)
Tichtiöfen: Dětochov, now Polná na Šumavě (e)
Tiechobuz: Těchobuz
Tiefenbach:
Desná II, p. of Desná (Jablonec nad Nisou District)
Hluboký, p. of Ostrov (Karlovy Vary District)
Tiefenfeld: Hluboká, p. of Kdyně
Tiefengrund: Hlubočec
Tiepersch: Těpeře, p. of Železný Brod
Tierlitzko: Těrlicko
Tieschan (Tischau): Těšany
Tieschetitz: Těšetice (Olomouc District)
Tieschowitz (Teschowitz): Těšovice (Prachatice District)
Tillendorf: Tylov, p. of Lomnice (Bruntál District)
Tilmitschau: Tlumačov (Domažlice District)
Tinischt: Týniště nad Orlicí
Tirna: Trnová, p. of Tisová (Tachov District)
Tirschnitz: Tršnice, p. of Cheb
Tisch: Ktiš
Tischau: Mstišov, p. of Dubí
Tischlern: Skubice, now Bohdalovice (e)
Tischnowitz: Tišnov
Tischtin: Tištín
Tissa: Tisová (Tachov District)
Tissa bei Bodenbach: Tisá
Tissau: Tisová, p. of Otročín
Tlumatschau: Tlumačov
Tmain: Tmaň
Tobitschau: Tovačov
Tochowitz: Tochovice
Todlau: Datelov, p. of Dešenice
Todnie: Todně, p. of Trhové Sviny
Tollenstein: Rozhled, p. of Jiřetín pod Jedlovou
Töplei (Tepley, Teplai): Teplá, p. of Třebenice (Litoměřice District)
Töpplitz: Teplice
Tomitschan: Domašín
Tonnberg: Hlinov, p. of Horní Stropnice
Tonetschlag: Rohanov
Töpeles: Teplička (Karlovy Vary District)
Topieletz: Topělec, p. of Čížová
Topkowitz: Dobkovice
Topolan: Topolany, p. of Olomouc
Totschnik: Točník
Tracht: Strachotín
Trasenau: Draženov
Traubek: Troubky
Trautenau: Trutnov
Trautenbach: Babí, p. of Trutnov
Traxelmoos: Slatiny
Trebelowitz (Trzebellowitz): Třebelovice
Trebendorf: Třebeň
Trebine: Třebín, p. of Úštěk
Trebitsch: Třebíč
Trebnitz:
Třebenice (Litoměřice District)
Třebnice, p. of Meclov
Třebnice, p. of Sedlčany
Trebusitz: Třebusice
Tremles: Strmilov
Treskonitz (Trzeskonitz): Třeskonice, p. of Tuchořice
Treublitz: Troubelice
Treunitz: Dřenice, p. of Cheb
Trhonin (Terhonin): Trhonín, p. of Svatá Maří
Trhow Kamenitz: Trhová Kamenice
Triebendorf: Třebarov
Triebitz: Třebovice
Trieblitz (Triblitz, Trziblitz): Třebívlice
Triebsch: Třebušín
Triebischl: Třebíška, p. of Výsluní
Triebschitz: Třebusice, now Most (e)
Triesch: Třešť
Triesenhof: Střížov, p. of Cheb
Trinka: Dřínek, now Hrobčice (e)
Trinksaifen: Rudné, p. of Vysoká Pec (Karlovy Vary District)
Tritesch: Střítež (Český Krumlov District)
Trnawka: Trnávka (Nový Jičín District)
Trippischen: Trpěšice, p. of Hartmanice (Klatovy District)
Tritschmersch: Střeziměřice, p. of Horní Stropnice
Trittschein: Třeština
Trnowan:
Trnovany
Trnovany, p. of Žatec
Trojanowitz: Trojanovice
Trojern: Trojany, p. of Dolní Dvořiště
Troppau: Opava
Tropplowitz: Opavice, p. of Město Albrechtice
Troschig: Strážky, p. of Ústí nad Labem
Trossau: Dražov, p. of Stanovice (Karlovy Vary District)
Trpist: Trpísty
Trschitz: Tršice
Trübenwasser: Kalná Voda, now Mladé Buky (e)
Truß: Ústí, p. of Kočov
Trzemoschna: Třemošná
Trziblitz: Třebívlice
Trzynietz (Trzinietz): Třinec
Tschachrau: Čachrov
Tschachwitz: Čachovice, now Březno (Chomutov District) (e)
Tschaslau: Čáslav
Tschaslawitz: Čáslavice
Tschastolowitz: Častolovice
Tschastrow: Častrov
Tschausch: Souš, p. of Most
Tschebon: Třebouň, p. of Toužim
Tscheche: Děčín XIX-Čechy
Tschechen: Čechyně, p. of Rousínov
Tschechisch-Teschen: Český Těšín
Tschechtitz: Čechtice
Tscheitsch: Čejč
Tschejkowitz: Čejkovice
Tschelakowitz: Čelákovice
Tschelechowitz (in der Hanna): Čelechovice na Hané
Tschenkowitz: Čenkovice
Tschentschitz:
Černčice, p. of Petrohrad
Černčice, p. of Žalany
Tscheraditz: Čeradice
Tschernahora: Černá Hora, p. of Bělá nad Radbuzou
Tschernhausen: Černousy
Tschernitz:
Černice, p. of Horní Jiřetín
Černice, p. of Mojné
Tschernoschin (Czernoschin): Černošín
Tschernoschitz: Černošice
Tschernowier: Černovír, p. of Olomouc
Tschernowitz:
Černovice (Blansko District)
Černovice (Chomutov District)
Černovice (Pelhřimov District)
Tschersing: Čeřeniště, p. of Malečov
Tschertin (Certin): Čertyně, p. of Dolní Třebonín
Tschestitz: Čestice (Strakonice District)
Tschiaschel: Čáslav, p. of Verneřice
Tschichtitz: Čichtice, p. of Bavorov
Tschies: Číhaná, p. of Bochov
Tschiest: Čistá u Horek
Tschihana: Číhání, p. of Chyše
Tschihoscht: Číhošť
Tschim: Čím
Tschimelitz: Cimelice
Tschimischel: Třemešek, p. of Oskava
Tschinowes: Ciněves
Tschirm: Čermná ve Slezsku
Tschischkowitz:
Čížkovice
Čížkovice 1.díl, p. of Maršovice (Jablonec nad Nisou District)
Tschisow (Trisau): Třísov, p. of Holubov
Tschitschow: Číčov, p. of Spálené Poříčí
Tschödrich: Štědrákova Lhota, p. of Ruda nad Moravou
Tschöppern: Čepirohy, p. of Most
Tuchorschitz: Tuchořice
Tulleschitz: Tulešice
Tünscht: Týniště, p. of Zubrnice
Tupadl:
Tupadly (Kutná Hora District)
Tupadly (Mělník District)
Tupadly, p. of Klatovy
Tüppelsgrün: Děpoltovice
Turas: Brno-Tuřany
Turban: Borovany, p. of Bor (Tachov District)
Turkowitz: Staré Dobrkovice, p. of Kájov
Türmaul: Drmaly, p. of Vysoká Pec (Chomutov District)
Türmitz: Trmice
Turn: Trnovany, p. of Teplice
Türnau: Městečko Trnávka
Turnau: Turnov
Turnitz: Tvrdonice
Tusch: Suš, p. of Bohdalovice
Tuschkau Stadt: Město Touškov
Tuschmitz: Tušimice, p. of Kadaň
Tusset: Stožec
Tussetschlag: Břevniště, now Boletice MTA (e)
Tutschap (Tuczap):
Tučapy (Tábor District)
Tučapy (Uherské Hradiště District)
Tučapy (Vyškov District)
Tutz: Dubec, p. of Třemešné
Tweras: Svéraz, p. of Bohdalovice
Twrdina: Tvrdín, p. of Hrobčice
Tyrn: Děrné
Tyssa: Tisá
Tzieschkowitz: Těškovice

U

Udritsch: Údrč, p. of Bochov
Überdörfel: Opatovec
Überschar: Přebytek, now Nové Město pod Smrkem
Uhersko: Uhersko
Uhligstal: Uhlíkov, now Želnava (e)
Uhritz (Uhrzitz): Uhřice (Hodonín District)
Uitwa (Uittwa): Útvina
Ujest: Újezd pod Přimdou, p. of Přimda
Ulbersdorf: Albrechtice, now Horní Jiřetín (e)
Ullersdorf: Oldřichov, p. of Jeníkov (Teplice District)
Ullersgrün: Oldřiš, p. of Merklín (Karlovy Vary District)
Ullershof: Oldřichov (Tábor District)
Ullersloh: Oldřichov, p. of Nejdek
Ullersreith: Oldřichov, p. of Tachov
Ullitz: Úlice
Ullrichsthal: Nový Oldřichov
Ulmbach: Jilmová, now Hora Svatého Šebestiána (e)
Ungarisch Brod: Uherský Brod
Ungarisch Hradisch: Uherské Hradiště
Ungarisch Ostra: Uherský Ostroh
Ungarschitz: Uherčice (Znojmo District)
Ungersdorf: Hranice IX-Uhřínov
Unhoscht: Unhošť
Unola (Unolla): Únehle
Unterberg: Střelcův Dvůr, now Omlenice (e)
Unter Borry: Dolní Bory, p. of Bory (Žďár nad Sázavou District)
Unter Brand: Dolní Žďár, p. of Ostrov (Karlovy Vary District)
Unter Breitenstein: Dolní Třebonín
Unter-Brezan: Dolní Břežany
Unter Dreihöfen: Dolní Záhoří, p. of Lubenec
Untergramling: Dolní Kramolín, p. of Chodová Planá
Unterhaid (Unter Haid): Dolní Dvořiště
Unter Hammer: Dolení Hamr, now Velké Hamry
Unterheiming (Unterhaiming): Podolí, now Bohdalovice (e)
Unterhöfen (Unter Höfen): Dolní Dvorce, p. of Kašperské Hory
Unter Hrachowitz: Dolní Hrachovice
Unter Jamny: Dolní Jamné, p. of Bezvěrov
Unterkörnsalz: Dolejší Krušec, p. of Hartmanice (Klatovy District)
Unter Kralowitz: Dolní Kralovice
Unter Kraupen: Dolní Krupá (Havlíčkův Brod District)
Unterkunreuth: Hraničná, p. of Pomezí nad Ohří
Unterlangendorf: Dolní Dlouhá Loučka, now Dlouhá Loučka (Olomouc District)
Unterlichtbuchet: Dolní Světlé Hory, now Strážný (e)
Unterlindau: Dolní Lipina, p. of Lipová (Cheb District)
Unter Lohma (Unterlohma): Dolní Lomany, p. of Františkovy Lázně
Unter Lomitz: Dolní Lomnice, p. of Doupovské Hradiště
Unterlosau: Dolní Lažany, p. of Lipová (Cheb District)
Unter Lukawitz: Dolní Lukavice
Untermarkschlag: Dolní Hraničná, now Přední Výtoň (e)
Untermaxdorf (Maxdorf): Dolní Maxov, p. of Josefův Důl (Jablonec nad Nisou District)
Untermoldau: Dolní Vltavice, p. of Černá v Pošumaví
Unter Neuern: Dolní Nýrsko, now Nýrsko
Unter Neugrün: Dolní Nivy
Unter Niemtsch: Dolní Němčí
Unter Niemtschitz: Dolní Němčice, p. of Dačice
Unterplandles: Dolní Pláně, p. of Věžovatá Pláně
Unterpolaun: Dolní Polubný, now Desná (Jablonec nad Nisou District)
Unter Potschernitz (Unter Pocernitz): Prague-Dolní Počernice
Unter Rosinka: Dolní Rožínka
Unter Reichenau: Dolní Rychnov
Unterreichenstein: Rejštejn
Unter Sandau: Dolní Žandov
Unterschlagl: Dolní Drkolná, p. of Vyšší Brod
Unterschneedorf: Dolní Sněžná, now Volary (e)
Unterschön: Dolní Dvory, p. of Cheb
Unterschönbach: Dolní Luby, p. of Luby (Cheb District)
Unterschönhub: Dolní Přísahov, now Vyšší Brod (e)
Unterschwarzbrunn: Dolní Černá Studnice, p. of Pěnčín (Jablonec nad Nisou District)
Unter Sekerschan (Unter Sekrzan): Dolní Sekyřany, p. of Heřmanova Huť
Untersinetschlag: Dolní Příbrání, now Pohorská Ves (e)
Untersteindlberg: Dolní Ždánidla, now Prášily (e)
Unterstögenwald: Pestřice, now Horní Planá (e)
Unter Tannowitz (Unter Dannowitz): Dolní Dunajovice
Unterteschau: Dolejší Těšov, p. of Hartmanice (Klatovy District)
Unterthemenau (Unter Themenau): Poštorná, p. of Břeclav
Untervollmau: Dolní Folmava, p. of Česká Kubice
Unterwald: Podlesí, p. of Brněnec
Unter Wernersdorf: Dolní Vernéřovice, now Jívka
Unterwielands: České Velenice
Unter Wisternitz: Dolní Věstonice
Unter Wohlau: Dolní Valov, p. of Bražec
Unter Wuldau: Dolní Vltavice, p. of Černá v Pošumaví
Unterzassau: Dolní Cazov, now Strážný (e)
Unter Zetno (Unter Cetno): Dolní Cetno, p. of Niměřice
Unterzwinzen: Dolní Svince, p. of Dolní Třebonín
Untschin: Unčín
Urbanau: Urbanov
Uretschlag: Meziřící, p. of Malonty
Urhau: Ořechov (Brno-Country District)
Urowitz: Vnarovy, p. of Vimperk
Ursprung: Počátky, p. of Kraslice
Urtschitz: Určice
Urzinau: Uhřínov
Uttigsdorf: Útěchov (Svitavy District)

V

Vierzighuben: Lány, p. of Svitavy
Vogelsang:
Lhotka, p. of Tisová (Tachov District)
Podlesí, p. of Kašperské Hory
Vogelseifen: Rudná pod Pradědem
Voigtsgrün: Fojtov, p. of Nejdek
Voigtskrosse: Fojtova Kraš, now Velká Kraš
Voitelsbrunn: Sedlec (Břeclav District)
Voitersreuth: Vojtanov
Voitsdorf:
Bohatice
Fojtovice, p. of Heřmanov (Děčín District)
Fojtovice, p. of Krupka
Vorderglöckelberg: Přední Zvonková, now Horní Planá
Vorder Heuraffl: Přední Výtoň
Vorderstift: Bližší Lhota, p. of Horní Planá
Vorder Zinnwald: Přední Cínovec, now Dubí (e)
Vöttau: Bítov (Znojmo District)

W

Wadetschlag: Svatonina Lhota, now Frymburk
Wadetstift: Hruštice, now Frymburk (e)
Wagstadt: Bílovec
Waier: Rybník (Domažlice District)
Waißak: Vysoká (Bruntál District)
Wakowitz: Vadkovice, p. of Chbany
Waldau: Valdov, p. of Jablonné v Podještědí
Walddörfel: Víska pod Lesy, p. of Česká Kamenice
Waldecke: Valdek, p. of Staré Křečany
Waldek: Zálesí, p. of Javorník (Jeseník District)
Waldenburg: Bělá, p. of Bělá pod Pradědem
Waldersgrün: Valtířov, now Nový Kramolín (e)
Waldetschlag: Valtéřov, p. of Benešov nad Černou
Waldheim: Nemrlov, now Oskava
Waldhof: Zborná, p. of Jihlava
Walditz: Valdice
Waldschnitz: Olešnice, p. of Ústí nad Labem
Walk: Valcha, p. of Stráž (Tachov District)
Wallachisch Bistritz: Valašská Bystřice
Wallachisch Klobouk: Valašské Klobouky
Wallachisch Meseritsch: Valašské Meziříčí
Wallern: Volary
Wallhof: Lesná, now Nový Kostel
Wällisch Birken (Wällischbirken): Vlachovo Březí
Wallisgrün (Wallisdorf): Kůzová, p. of Čistá (Rakovník District)
Wallstein: Valštejn, p. of Město Albrechtice
Walschowitz: Hranice VI-Valšovice 
Waltersdorf:
Valteřice, p. of Žandov
Vrchy
Žleb, p. of Hanušovice
Waltersgrün: Valtéřov, p. of Kraslice
Waltirsche: Valtířov, p. of Velké Březno
Waltsch: Valeč (Karlovy Vary District)
Wamberg: Vamberk
Wanow: Vaňov, p. of Ústí nad Labem
Wanowitz: Vanovice
Warnsdorf: Varnsdorf
Warta: Stráž nad Ohří
Wartenberg: Sedmihorky, p. of Karlovice (Semily District)
Wartenberg am Rollberg: Stráž pod Ralskem
Warth: Stráž, p. of Sušice
Warwaschau: Varvažov
Waschagrün: Výškov, p. of Chodová Planá
Wasserhäuseln: Vodná, p. of Bečov nad Teplou
Wassersuppen: Nemanice
Wassertrompeten: Ostromeč, p. of Velký Malahov
Watetitz: Vatětice, p. of Hartmanice (Klatovy District)
Watislaw: Vlastislav
Watkowitz: Vadkovice, p. of Předotice
Watzelsdorf: Václavov, p. of Zábřeh
Watzgenreuth: Vackovec, p. of Milhostov
Watzkenreuth: Vackov, p. of Plesná
Wawrowitz: Vávrovice, p. of Opava
Webeschan: Bžany (Teplice District)
Weckelsdorf: Teplice nad Metují
Weckersdorf: Křinice
Wedlitz: Vědlice, p. of Úštěk
Wegstädtl: Štětí
Weheditz: Bohatice, p. of Karlovy Vary
Weichseln: Vyšný, p. of Český Krumlov
Weiden:
Pastviny
Vrbka
Weiden überm Walde: Vrbno nad Lesy
Weidenau: Vidnava
Weidmesgrün: Vykmanov, p. of Ostrov (Karlovy Vary District)
Weigelsdorf:
Vajglov, p. of Břidličná
Vikantice
Volanov, p. of Trutnov
Weigsdorf: Višňová (Liberec District)
Weikersdorf: Vikýřovice
Weine: Víno, p. of Slezské Rudoltice
Weipert: Vejprty
Weipersdorf: Výprachtice
Weirowa (Weyrowa): Výrov, p. of Blížejov
Weiskirchen (Weiskirch): Hranice (Přerov District)
Weissbach:
Bílý Potok (Liberec District)
Bílý Potok, p. of Javorník (Jeseník District)
Bílý Potok, p. of Vrbno pod Pradědem
Weißenstein: Bílý Kámen
Weißensulz: Bělá nad Radbuzou
Weißkirchen:
Bílý Kostel nad Nisou
Bílý Kostelec, p. of Úštěk
Weißkirchlitz: Novosedlice
Weissöhlhütten: Bílá Lhota
Weißpodol: Bílé Podolí
Weiss Politschan: Bílé Poličany
Weißstätten: Pasohlávky
Weissthurm: Třebíz
Weiß Tremeschna: Bílá Třemešná
Weisswasser: Bělá pod Bezdězem
Weißwasser:
Bílá Voda
Bílá Voda, p. of Červená Voda (Ústí nad Orlicí District)
Weitentrebetisch: Široké Třebčice, p. of Veliká Ves (Chomutov District)
Wekelsdorf: Teplice nad Metují
Welbine:
Lbín, p. of Bžany (Teplice District)
Lbín, now Hlinná
Welboth: Velvěty, p. of Rtyně nad Bílinou
Welbuditz: Velebudice, p. of Most
Welchau:
Velichov
Velichov, p. of Žatec
Welchow: Velichovky
Welehrad: Velehrad
Weleschin: Velešín
Welhartitz: Velhartice
Welhenitz: Lhenice, p. of Bžany (Teplice District)
Welhotta:
Lhota, p. of Trutnov
(Welhota an der Elbe): Lhotka nad Labem
Welka: Velká nad Veličkou
Welkan: Lkáň
Welken: Hranice III-Velká
Welleborsch: Veleboř, p. of Klopina
Wellemin (Welemin): Velemín
Wellen (Welim): Velim
Welleschitz (Weleschitz): Velešice, p. of Hoštka
Wellnitz: Velenice (Česká Lípa District)
Welmschloss: Velemyšleves
Welperschitz: Erpužice
Weltrus: Veltrusy
Weltschowitz: Vlčovice, p. of Kopřivnice
Welwarn (Welbern): Velvary
Wemschen: Mšeno
Wendrin: Vendryně
Wenzelsdorf:
Děčín XXII-Václavov
Václavovice, p. of Klimkovice
Wenzlowitz: Václavovice
Wenussen: Bdeněves
Werdenberg: Vítovka, p. of Odry
Werenitz: Zvěřenice, p. of Záblatí (Prachatice District)
Werhowina: Vrchovina, p. of Sychrov (Liberec District)
Werlsberg: Vršek, p. of Jáchymov
Wermieritz (Wermeritz): Hřiměždice
Wermsdorf: Vernířovice
Wernersdorf: Jívka
Wernersreuth: Vernéřov, p. of Aš
Wernsdorf:
Verneřice, p. of Hrob
Vernéřov, now Klášterec nad Ohří (e)
Veřovice
Wernstadt: Verneřice
Werth: Luh nad Svatavou, p. of Josefov (Sokolov District)
Weschekun: Vysočany, p. of Bor (Tachov District)
Weschen: Věšťany, p. of Modlany
Weselitschko: Veselíčko (Písek District)
Weselitz: Veselice, p. of Velká Jesenice
Weserau: Bezvěrov, p. of Teplá
Weseritz: Bezdružice
Weshor (Weshorsch): Zhoř (Tachov District)
Wesigau: Bezděkov, p. of Bor (Tachov District)
Wessele: Veselka, p. of Vimperk
Wesseli: Veselí, p. of Železný Brod
Wesseli an der Lainsitz: Veselí nad Lužnicí
Wesselitschko: Veselíčko (Přerov District)
Wesseln:
Veselí, p. of Pavlov (Šumperk District)
Veselí, p. of Zákupy
Wessely an der March: Veselí nad Moravou
Wessiedel: Veselí, p. of Odry
Wettern: Větřní
Wetterstein: Třtí, p. of Sychrov (Liberec District)
Wetzlers: Veclov, p. of Staré Město pod Landštejnem
Wetzmühl: Vícemily, p. of Svatá Maří
Wetzwalde: Václavice, p. of Hrádek nad Nisou
Wichstadtl: Mladkov
Wickwitz: Vojkovice (Karlovy Vary District)
Wieden: Chudějov, now Žár
Wiederbruck: Vydří Most, p. of Kvilda
Wiedergrün: Podlesí, p. of Světlá Hora
Wieles: Běleň, now Malšín
Wiesch: Věž
Wieschka: Vížka, p. of Planá (Tachov District)
Wiese:
Loučky, p. of Zátor
Louka u Litvínova
(an der Igel): Luka nad Jihlavou
Ves, p. of Černousy
Wiesen: Vižňov, p. of Meziměstí
Wiesenberg: Loučná nad Desnou
Wiesengrund: Dobřany
Wiesenthal: Loučné, p. of Jiříkov
Wiesenthal an der Neiße: Lučany nad Nisou
Wieznitz (Wesenz): Věžnice (Jihlava District)
Wigstadtl: Vítkov
Wihen: Výheň, p. of Netřebice (Český Krumlov District)
Wihlaw: Vlhavy, p. of Sedlec (České Budějovice District)
Wihorschau: Běhařov
Wihorschen (Wihoren): Hlásná Lhota, p. of Záblatí (Prachatice District)
Wiklantitz: Vyklantice
Wildenschwert: Ústí nad Orlicí
Wildgrub: Václavov u Bruntálu
Wildschütz:
Vlčice (Jeseník District)
Vlčice (Trutnov District)
Wildstein: Skalná
Wilhelmshöhe: Jizerka, p. of Kořenov
Wilimowitz: Vilémovice (Havlíčkův Brod District)
Wilken: Vlkaň, p. of Radonice (Chomutov District)
Wilkischau: Vlkošov, p. of Bezvěrov
Wilkowitz: Vlkovice
Willenz (Wilenz):
Bílenec, p. of Petrohrad
Vílanec
Willimowitz: Vilémovice (Blansko District)
Willmersdorf: Věřňovice, p. of Dolní Lutyně
Willomitz: Vilémov (Chomutov District)
Wilsdorf: Děčín XII-Vilsnice
Winar: Prague-Vinoř
Winarsch: Vinaře
Winau:
Štiptoň, p. of Nové Hrady (České Budějovice District)
(Winow): Zbinohy
Windig Jenikau: Větrný Jeníkov
Windisch Kamnitz: Srbská Kamenice
Windschau: Onšov (Znojmo District)
Winitz:
Vinice, p. of Vinaře
Výnězda, p. of Omlenice
Winkelsdorf: Kouty nad Desnou, p. of Loučná nad Desnou
Winney: Vinné, p. of Ploskovice
Winterberg: Vimperk
Winteritz: Vintířov, p. of Radonice (Chomutov District)
Wintersgrün: Vintířov
Wirbitz: Vrbice, p. of Bohumín
Wischau: Vyškov
Wischehor (Wyschehor): Vyšehoří
Wischenau: Višňové (Znojmo District)
Wischkowa: Výškov
Wischkowitz:
Výškovice, p. of Bílovec
Výškovice, p. of Ostrava
Výškovice, p. of Vimperk
Wiska: Víska (Havlíčkův Brod District)
Wissek (Wisek): Vísky (Blansko District)
Wisterschan: Bystřany
Wistersitz: Bystřice, p. of Bělá nad Radbuzou
Wistritz: Bystřice, p. of Dubí
Witkowitz:
Vítkovice (Semily District)
Vítkovice, p. of Lubenec
Witoseß (Wittosses): Bitozeves
Wittanau (Witanow): Vítanov
Wittingau:
Třeboň
Vitíněves, p. of Staré Město pod Landštejnem
Wittingreith: Vítkov, p. of Tachov
Wittkowitz: Vítkovice, p. of Ostrava
Wittowitz: Vítovice, p. of Rousínov
Witzemil: Vícemil
Wladar: Vladořice, p. of Žlutice
Wladislau: Vladislav (Třebíč District)
Wlastowitz: Vlaštovičky, p. of Opava
Wlkosch (Wilkosch): Vlkoš (Přerov District)
Wobern: Obrovice, p. of Radonice (Chomutov District)
Wockendorf: Jelení, now Milotice nad Opavou
Wodalnowitz: Odolenovice, p. of Jenišovice (Jablonec nad Nisou District)
Wodierad: Voděrady, p. of Frýdštejn
Wodlochowitz: Odlochovice, p. of Jankov (Benešov District)
Wodnian: Vodňany
Wodolau (Wodolow): Odolov, p. of Malé Svatoňovice
Wodolitz: Odolice, p. of Bělušice (Most District)
Wodolka: Odolena Voda
Wogau: Vokov, p. of Třebeň
Wohar (Woharz, Woharsch): Ohaře
Wohnischtan (Wochnischtian, Wohnistan): Ohnišťany
Wohnung: Vojnín, p. of Radonice (Chomutov District)
Wohontsch: Ohníč
Wohrasenitz: Ohrazenice (Semily District)
Woisetschlag: Boršíkov, now Vyšší Brod (e)
Woiten: Vojtín, now Malšín (e)
Woitzdorf:
Vojtíškov, p. of Malá Morava
Vojtovice, p. of Vlčice (Jeseník District)
Wojnomiestetz: Vojnův Městec
Wojslawitz: Vojslavice
Woken (bei Hirschberg): Okna (Česká Lípa District)
Wolenitz:
Volenice (Příbram District)
Volenice (Strakonice District)
Wolepschitz: Volevčice (Most District)
Woleschna:
Olešná (Havlíčkův Brod District)
Olešná (Pelhřimov District)
Olešná (Písek District)
Olešná (Rakovník District)
Woleschnitz: Zlatá Olešnice (Jablonec nad Nisou District)
Wolfersdorf:
Olbramov
Volfartice
Wolfirz (Wolfers): Volfířov
Wölfling: Vlčí
Wolframitz: Olbramovice (Znojmo District)
Wolframitzkirchen: Olbramkostel
Wolframs: Kostelec (Jihlava District)
Wolfsberg: Vlčí Hora, p. of Krásná Lípa
Wolfschlag: Vojslavy, now Hořice na Šumavě (e)
Wolfsdorf:
Vlčnov, p. of Starý Jičín
Vlkovice, p. of Fulnek
Wolfsgrub: Vlčí Jámy, p. of Lenora (Prachatice District)
Wolfshäuser (Wolfsgrub): Vlčí Jámy, now Boletice MTA (e)
Wolfsthal: Vlčí Důl, p. of Česká Lípa
Wolin: Volyně
Wölking: Dolní Bolíkov, p. of Cizkrajov
Wolledorf: Vlachov, p. of Lukavice (Šumperk District)
Wollein: Měřín
Wolleschna: Olešná (Beroun District)
Wolletschlag: Volovice, p. of Prachatice
Wollmersdorf: Olbramice (Ostrava-City District)
Wollschy: Olší (Jihlava District)
Wölmsdorf: Vilémov (Děčín District)
Wolschan: Olšany (Klatovy District)
Wolta: Voletiny, p. of Trutnov
Wonschow (Wonschau): Onšov (Pelhřimov District)
Wonschowitz: Onšovice, p. of Čkyně
Woporschan (Woporan): Opařany
Woraschne: Dvorečná, now Loučovice
Woratschen: Oráčov
Worka: Borek, p. of Pšov
Wörles: Ostrov, p. of Malšín
Worlik: Orlík nad Vltavou
Worhabschen: Vrhaveč, p. of Kostelec (Tachov District)
Worowitz: Borovice, p. of Horšovský Týn
Woschana: Hvožďany, p. of Úněšov
Woschnitz: Boječnice, p. of Bor (Tachov District)
Wosek
Osek (Písek District)
(Wosseli): Osek (Rokycany District)
Oseky, p. of Prachatice
Wosseletz (Woseletz): Oselce
Wostitz: Vlasatice
Wostratschin: Osvračín
Wostromer (Wostromier): Ostroměř
Wostrow:
(Wostrau): Ostrov (Chrudim District)
Ostrov, p. of Prachatice
Wostrowa: Ostrov u Bezdružic
Wotitz: Votice
Wotsch: Boč, p. of Stráž nad Ohří
Wottawa: [[Otava (river)|Otava] (river)
Wottin: Otín (Žďár nad Sázavou District)
Wran (Wrana): Vrané nad Vltavou
Wranna (Wrana): Vraný
Wranow:
Břasy
(Wranowey): Vranové 1. díl and Vranové 2.díl, parts of Malá Skála
Wranowa: Vranov (Tachov District)
Wrasch (Wraz): Vráž (Písek District)
Wrat: Vrát, p. of Koberovy
Wratzow (Wrazow): Vracov
Wrbatek: Vrbátky
Wrbka: Vrbka
Wrbno am Walde: Vrbno nad Lesy
Wrcen (Wrtschin): Vrčeň
Wrchhaben: Vrchovany
Wreschin: Vřesina (Opava District)
Wrschowitz: Vršovice (Opava District)
Wrzessin: Vřesina (Ostrava-City District)
Wschechowitz:
Všechovice (Brno-Country District)
Všechovice (Přerov District)
Wschechrom: Všechromy, p. of Strančice
Wschejan: Všejany
Wschelis: Velké Všelisy
Wscherau: Všeruby (Plzeň-North District)
Wschestar (Wsestar):
Všestary (Hradec Králové District)
Všestary (Prague-East District)
Wschetat: Všetaty (Mělník District)
Wschetul: Všetuly, p. of Holešov
Wsetin: Vsetín
Wteln: Vtelno, p. of Most
Wtelno: Mělnické Vtelno
Wudingrün: Vítkov, p. of Sokolov (e)
Wühr: Vír
Wullachen: Bolechy, now Vyšší Brod
Wünschendorf: Srbská, p. of Horní Řasnice
Würbenthal: Vrbno pod Pradědem
Wurken: Borek, p. of Stráž (Tachov District)
Wurretschhöfen: Březí, now Bohdalovice (e)
Wurz: Dvorec, p. of Chyše
Wurzelsdorf: Kořenov
Wurzmes: Vrskmaň
Wusleben: Bohuslav, now Staré Sedliště (e)
Wüstenmühl: Pustý Mlýn, p. of Brumovice (Opava District)
Wüstpohlom: Pustá Polom
Wüst Seibersdorf: Pusté Žibřidovice, p. of Jindřichov (Šumperk District)
Wustung: Poustka, p. of Višňová (Liberec District)
Wüstung: Pustiny, p. of Letohrad
Wuttau: Butov, p. of Stříbro

X
Xaverhof: Xaverov

Z

Zaap: Zápy
Zablatz: Záblatí, p. of Bohumín
Zabrzech: Zábřeh, p. of Ostrava
Zabrzeh: Zábřeh, p. of Dolní Benešov
Zahay: Zahájí
Zahne: Saň, p. of Višňová (Liberec District)
Zahortschitz: Zahorčice, p. of Boršov nad Vltavou
Zahradka:
Zahrádka (Plzeň-North District)
Zahrádka (Třebíč District)
Zahrádka, p. of Čachrov
Zahrádka, p. of Mirkovice
Zahroby: Záhrobí, p. of Bělčice
Zaisa: Čížov, p. of Horní Břečkov
Zakolan: Zákolany
Zaltitz: Žaltice, p. of Mirkovice
Zaluzan: Zalužany
Zamlekau: Zavlekov
Zamrsk: Zámrsk
Zartlesdorf: Rybník, p. of Dolní Dvořiště
Zaschau: Zašová
Zasmuk: Zásmuky
Zastawka: Zastávka
Zattig: Sádek, p. of Velké Heraltice
Zauchtel (Zauchtl, Zauchtenthal): Suchdol nad Odrou
Zauditz: Sudice (Opava District)
Zaunfeld: Plotiště nad Labem, p. of Hradec Králové
Zautig: Soutěsky, p. of Malá Veleň
Zautke: Sudkov
Zawada: Závada, p. of Petrovice u Karviné
Zawada bei Beneschau: Závada (Opava District)
Zbeschau: Zbýšov
Zbirow: Zbiroh
Zborow:
Zborov (Šumperk District)
Zborovy
Zbraslau: Zbraslav (Brno-Country District)
Zdaslaw: Zdeslav, p. of Poleň
Zdechowitz: Zdechovice (Pardubice District)
Zdiaretz: Žďárec
Zdiar (Schdiar):
Žďár (Blansko District)
Žďár (Jindřichův Hradec District)
Žďár (Mladá Boleslav District)
Žďár (Písek District)
Zdib: Zdiby
Zdislawitz: Zdislavice
Zdounek: Zdounky
Zebau: Cebiv
Zeberheisch: Dřevohryzy, p. of Toužim
Zebus: Chcebuz, p. of Štětí
Zech: Údolí, p. of Loket
Zechitz: Stránské, p. of Rýmařov
Zechnitz (Zehnitz): Cehnice
Zechowitz: Zdechovice (Hradec Králové District)
Zeschdorf: Těšíkov, p. of Šternberk
Zeidelweid: Brťov u Černé Hory, p. of Brťov-Jeneč
Zeidler: Brtníky, p. of Staré Křečany
Zeisau: Čížov
Zeiske: Tísek
Zeislitz: Cejsice, p. of Vimperk
Zelechowitz: Želechovice nad Dřevnicí
Zenkau: Čenkov, p. of Třešť
Zemschen: Třemešné
Zerawitz: Žeravice (Hodonín District)
Zerutek: Žerůtky (Znojmo District)
Zerwitz (Zerhowitz): Cerhovice
Zetkowitz: Cetkovice
Zetoras: Cetoraz
Zetschin: Čečín, p. of Bělá nad Radbuzou
Zettendorf: Cetnov, p. of Cheb
Zettl: Sedlo, p. of Klíny
Zettlitz:
(Zedtlitz): Sedlec, p. of Karlovy Vary
Sedlec u Radonic, p. of Radonice (Chomutov District)
Zettwing: Cetviny, now Dolní Dvořiště
Zhorz: Zhoř, p. of Vilémov (Havlíčkův Brod District)
Ziaroschitz: Žarošice
Zichlern: Těchlov, now Hořice na Šumavě (e)
Zichraß: Těchoraz, p. of Vyšší Brod
Zidowitz:
Židovice (Jičín District)
Židovice (Litoměřice District)
Zieberle: Úbočí, p. of Výsluní
Ziebetschlag: Přibyslavov, now Dolní Dvořiště (e)
Zieditz: Citice
Ziegelhütten: Cihelny, p. of Karlovy Vary
Ziegenschacht: Stráň, p. of Potůčky
Ziering: Čeřín, p. of Rožmitál na Šumavě
Zimrowitz: Žimrovice, p. of Hradec nad Moravicí
Zinnwald: Cínovec, p. of Dubí
Zinolten: Senotín, p. of Nová Bystřice
Zirkowitz: Církvice, p. of Ústí nad Labem
Zirnau: Dříteň
Zirnetschlag: Bělá, p. of Malonty
Zistl: Dobrné, p. of Větřní
Zittolieb (Zitolib): Cítoliby
Ziwotitz: Životice, p. of Havířov
Zlabings: Slavonice
Zleb: Žleby
Znaim: Znojmo
Zoboles: Sovolusky, p. of Bochov
Zobietitz:
Sobětice, p. of Klatovy
Sobětice, p. of Výsluní
Zodl: Sádlno, now Boletice MTA (e)
Zöptau: Sobotín
Zossen: Sosnová (Opava District)
Zosum: Ždánov, p. of Nezdice na Šumavě
Zowalka: Zouvalka, p. of Prusy-Boškůvky
Zubern: Zubří
Zuckerhandl: Suchohrdly
Zuckmantel (Zuckmantl):
Pozorka, p. of Dubí
Žďárek, p. of Libouchec
Zlaté Hory
Zuderschlag: Cudrovice, now Volary (e)
Zulb: Slup
Zummern: Souměř, p. of Stráž (Tachov District)
Zürau: Siřem, p. of Blšany
Zutzlawitz: Sudslavice, p. of Vimperk
Zwarmetschlag: Svatomírov, now Vyšší Brod (e)
Zweiendorf: Svébohy, p. of Horní Stropnice
Zweifelsreuth: Čižebná, p. of Nový Kostel
Zwetbau: Svatobor, p. of Doupovské Hradiště
Zwettnitz: Světice, p. of Bystřany
Zwickau: Zvíkov (Český Krumlov District)
Zwickau in Böhmen: Cvikov
Zwieslau: Světlá, p. of Hartmanice (Klatovy District)
Zwikow: Zvíkov (České Budějovice District)
Zwikowetz (Zwickowitz): Zvíkovec
Zwittau: Svitavy
Zwitte: Svitava (river)
Zwittawka (Zwittales): Svitávka (Blansko District)
Zwittermühl: Háje, now Potůčky (e)
Zwodau: Svatava (Sokolov District)
Zwoischen: Svojše, p. of Rejštejn
Zwucitz: Svučice, p. of Mišovice
Zwug: Zbůch

References

External links
19th century maps of the Czech Republic, a project of Jan Evangelista Purkyně University in Ústí nad Labem
19th century map of the Czech Republic at Mapy.cz

German diaspora in the Czech Republic
Czech geographic history
Czech
Czech Republic
Czech Republic
Czech Republic history-related lists
Names of places in the Czech Republic